

Future shows

Seven
 The 1% Club (Seven Network game show 2023–)
 Apartment Rules (Seven Network reality 2023–)
 Animals Aboard with Dr Harry (Seven Network reality 2023–)
 Armchair Experts (Seven Network sports 2023–)
 Australian Idol (Network Ten 2003–2009, Seven Network reality 2022–)
 Blow Up (Seven Network reality 2023–)
 The Claremont Murders (Seven Network drama 2023–)
 Con Girl (Seven Network drama 2023–)
 Fam Time (Seven Network comedy 2023–)
 Local Council (Seven Network comedy 2023–)
 Million Dollar Island (Seven Network reality 2023–)
 We Interrupt This Broadcast (Seven Network comedy 2023–)

Nine
 Australia's Most Identical (reality Nine Network 2023–)
 Beach House Escape (reality Nine Network 2022–)
 Big Miracles (reality Nine Network 2023–)
 Celebrity IOU Australia (reality Nine Network)
 Country Home Rescue (reality Nine Network 2022–)
 Dream Listings (reality Nine Network 2023–) 
 Gordon Ramsay's Food Stars (reality Nine Network 2023–)
 Human Error (drama Nine Network 2023–)
 My Mum, Your Dad (reality Nine Network 2022–)
 The Summit (reality Nine Network 2023–)
 Warnie (drama Nine Network 2023–)

Ten
 Dogs Behaving (Very) Badly  (Network Ten 2023–)
 The Challenge: Australia (Network Ten 2022–)
 Dessert Masters (Network Ten 2023–)
 The First Inventors (doco Network Ten 2023–)
 Location Location Location Australia (Lifestyle 2012–2014, Network Ten 2023–)
 NCIS: Sydney (drama Network Ten 2023–)
 North Shore (drama Network Ten 2023–)
 Paper Dolls (drama Network Ten 2023–)
 Riptide (drama Network Ten 2023–)
 Taskmaster (Network Ten 2023–)

ABC
 Aunty Donna's Coffee Cafe (comedy ABC 2023–)
 Australia’s Wild Odyssey (factual ABC 2023–)
 Back in Time for the Corner Shop (lifestyle ABC 2023–)
 Bay of Fires (drama ABC 2023–)
 Better Date Than Never (factual ABC 2023–)
 The Black Hand (factual ABC 2023–)
 Crazy Fun Park (children's ABC ME 2023–)
 First Weapons (factual ABC 2023–)
 Gold Diggers (comedy ABC 2023–)
 Goodwood (drama ABC 2022–)
 Great Australian Stuff (factual ABC 2023–)
 House of Gods (drama ABC 2023–)
 In Our Blood (drama ABC 2023–)
 Limbo (comedy ABC 2023–)
 The Messenger (drama ABC 2023–)
 Mother and Son (comedy ABC 1984–1994, 2023–)
 New Leash on Life (factual ABC 2023–)
 Queerstralia (factual/doco ABC 2023–)
 The Spooky Files (children's ABC ME 2023–) 
 Stories from Oz (comedy ABC 2022–)
 Turn Up The Volume (children's ABC ME 2023–)

SBS
 Alone Australia (reality SBS 2023–)
 Asking for It (doco SBS 2023–)
 Barossa Gourmet with Justine Schofield (lifestyle SBS Food 2023–)
 Barrumbi Kids (children's NITV 2022–)
 The Big School Swap (doco SBS 2023–)
 The Chocolate Queen (lifestyle SBS Food 2023–)
 Erotic Stories (drama SBS 2023–)
 The First Inventors (doco SBS 2023–)
 Great Australian Walks with Julia Zemiro (factual/doco SBS 2023–)
 Inside Sydney Airport (doco SBS 2023–)
 Khanh Ong’s Wild Food (lifestyle SBS Food 2023–)
 Luke Nguyen’s Indian Insights (lifestyle SBS Food 2023–)
 The Matchmakers (doco SBS 2023–)
 Safe Home (drama SBS 2023–)
 Paradise Kitchen Bali with Lauren Camilleri (lifestyle SBS Food 2023–)
 While the Men Are Away (drama SBS 2023–)
 Who The Bloody Hell Are We? (doco SBS 2023–)

Foxtel / Binge
 Colin from Accounts (comedy 2022–)
 The Repair Shop Australia (reality 2023–)
 Strife (drama Foxtel 2023–)

Stan
 Bad Behaviour (Stan drama 2022–)
 Black Snow (Stan drama 2022–)
 C*A*U*G*H*T (Stan drama 2023–)
 Prosper (Stan drama 2023–)
 Year Of (Stan drama 2023–)

Amazon Prime
 Class of '07 (Amazon Prime comedy 2022–)
 Deadloch (Amazon Prime comedy 2023–)
 The Lost Flowers of Alice Hart (Amazon Prime drama 2022–)

Paramount+
 The Appleton Ladies Potato Race (drama Paramount+ 2023–)
 Last King of the Cross (drama Paramount+ 2023–)
 Tom Weekly Versus… (children's Paramount+ 2023–)

Disney+
 The Clearing (Disney+ drama 2023)
 The Artful Dodger (Disney+ drama 2023)
 Last Days of the Space Age (Disney+ drama 2023)

Netflix
 Boy Swallows Universe  (Netflix drama 2023)
 Gymnastics Academy: A Second Chance (Netflix children's 2022)
 Wellmania (Netflix drama 2022)

Acorn TV
 TBA

Apple TV+
 TBA

In production

Arts and culture 
 Art Works (ABC 2021–)
 Message Stick (ABC 1999–)

Children, teens and family

 100% Wolf (ABC ME 2021–)
 Alien TV (9Go! 2019–)
 Beep and Mort (ABC Kids 2022–)
 Berry Bees (9Go! 2019–)
 Bluey (ABC Kids 2018–)
 BrainBuzz (9Go! 2018–)
 Built to Survive (ABC 2022–)
 Calvin and Kaison's Play Power (Nick Jr 2020, 10 Shake)
 Dive Club (Network Ten 2021–)
 Drop Dead Weird (7TWO 2017–)
 Dumbotz (9Go! 2019–)
 First Day (ABC ME 2020–)
 Get It Together (ABC ME 2019–)
 Ginger & the Vegesaurus (ABC Kids 2022–)
 Good Game: Spawn Point (ABC3/ABC ME 2010–)
 I Am Me (9Go! 2020–)
 Kangaroo Beach (ABC Kids 2021–)
 Kitty is Not a Cat (7TWO 2018–)
 Lah-Lah's Stripy Sock Club (ABC Kids 2019–)
 MaveriX (ABC ME 2022–)
 Mikki vs The World (ABC ME 2021–)
 The New Legends of Monkey (ABC ME 2018–)
 Play School (ABC 1966–2013, ABC4Kids/ABC Kids 2013–)
 The PM's Daughter (ABC ME 2022-)
 Ready Set Dance (Nick Jr 2019–)
 Reef School (ABC ME 2023–)
 Rock Island Mysteries (10 Shake/Nickelodeon 2022-)
 Shake Tales (2020–)
 Smashhdown! (9Go! 2018–)
 Space Nova (9Go!/ABC ME 2021–)
 Spongo, Fuzz & Jalapena (ABC ME 2019–)
 Soundtrack to Our Teenage Zombie Apocalypse (ABC ME 2022–)
 The Strange Chores (ABC ME 2019–)
 Surviving Summer (Netflix teen drama 2022)
 Ultimate Classroom (10 Shake 2022-)
 The Wiggles' World (ABC Kids 2020–)
 The Wonder Gang (ABC Kids 2021–)
 Yamba's Playtime (Imparja Television 1995–, Nine Network 2012, 9Go! 2013–, NITV 2013–)

Comedy

 Aftertaste (ABC 2021–)
 The Cheap Seats (Network Ten 2021–)
 Fisk (ABC 2021–)
 Frayed (ABC 2019–) 
 Gogglebox Australia (The Lifestyle Channel/Network Ten 2015–)
 Gruen (ABC 2008–)
 Have You Been Paying Attention? (Network Ten 2013–) 
 Just For Laughs Australia (Network Ten 2013–) (Fox Comedy 2013–)

 Question Everything (ABC 2021–2022)
 Shaun Micallef's Mad as Hell (ABC 2012–2022)
 Summer Love (ABC 2022–)
 The Weekly with Charlie Pickering (ABC 2015–)
 Utopia (ABC 2014–2019, 2023–)
 Why Are You Like This (ABC/ABC TV Plus 2018–)

Documentaries
 Australian Story (ABC 1996–)
 Compass (ABC 1998–)

Drama

 Bump (Stan 2021–)
 Five Bedrooms (Network Ten 2019, Paramount+ 2021–)
 The Gloaming (Stan 2020–)
 Heartbreak High (2022 TV series) (Netflix 2022-)
 Irreverent (Peacock/Netflix 2022–)
 Love Me (Fox Showcase 2021–)
 More Than This (Paramount+ 2022–)
 Ms Fisher's Modern Murder Mysteries (Seven Network 2019, Acorn TV 2021–)
 My Life is Murder (Network Ten 2019, Acorn TV 2021–)
 The Newsreader (ABC 2021–)
 Savage River (ABC 2022–)
 Significant Others (ABC 2022–)
 The Secrets She Keeps (Network Ten 2020–)
 Spreadsheet (Paramount+ 2022–)
 Total Control (ABC 2019–)

Factual

 Ambulance Australia (Network Ten 2018–)
 Aussie Gold Hunters (Foxtel Discovery 2016–)
 Aussie Lobster Men (7mate 2019–)
 Aussie Salvage Squad (7mate 2018–)
 The Australian Wars (SBS 2022–)
 Australia Behind Bars (Nine Network 2022–)
 Back Roads (ABC 2015–)
 Bondi Rescue (Network Ten 2006–2021)
 Bondi Vet: Coast to Coast (Nine Network 2019–)
 Border Security: Australia's Front Line (Seven Network 2004–)
 Catalyst (ABC 2001–)
 Coast Australia (Foxtel History 2013–)
 Deadly Down Under (7mate 2018–)
 Desert Collectors (Foxtel A&E 2018–)
 Desert Vet (Nine Network 2019–)
 The Dog House Australia (Network Ten 2021–)
 Dr. Lisa to the Rescue (Nine Network 2016–)
 Every Family Has A Secret (SBS 2019–)
 Fearless (Amazon Prime 2022–)
 The Force: Behind the Line (Seven Network 2006–)
 Highway Patrol (Seven Network 2009–2014, 2019–)
 Inside the Sydney Opera House (ABC 2022–)
 MegaTruckers (7mate 2012–)
 Missing Persons Investigations (Nine Network 2022–)
 Old People's Home for Teenagers (ABC 2022–)
 Outback Opal Hunters (Foxtel Discovery 2018–)
 Outback Ringer (ABC 2020–)
 Outback Truckers (Seven Network 2012, 7mate 2016–)
 Outback Wrangler (9Go!, Nine Network 2016–)
 Paramedics (Nine Network 2018–)
 The Pet Rescuers (Nine Network 2021–)
 RBT (Nine Network 2010–)
 Road to Riches (A&E 2019–)
 Space 22 (ABC 2022–)
 Stuff the British Stole (ABC 2022–)
 Taronga: Who's Who in the Zoo (Nine Network 2020–)
 Territory Cops (Crime & Investigation Network 2012, Network Ten 2016, 2021)
 Todd Sampson's Body Hack (Network Ten 2016–)
 Towies (7mate 2016–)
 War On Waste (ABC 2017–2018, 2023–)
 Where Are You Really From? (SBS 2018–)
 Who Do You Think You Are? (SBS 2008–)

Game shows

 Australian Ninja Warrior (Nine Network 2017–)
 Celebrity Letters and Numbers (SBS 2021–)
 The Chase Australia (Seven Network 2015–)
 Hard Quiz (ABC 2016–)
 Have You Been Paying Attention? (Network Ten 2013–)
 Holey Moley (Seven Network 2021—)
 The Hundred with Andy Lee (Nine Network 2021)
 Mastermind (ABC 1978–1984, SBS 2019–)
 Millionaire Hot Seat (Nine Network 2009–)
 Shaun Micallef's Brain Eisteddfod (Network Ten 2022–)
 Ultimate Tag (Seven Network 2021)
 Would I Lie To You? Australia (Network Ten 2022–)

Lifestyle

 10 Minute Kitchen (Network Ten 2021—)
 Alive and Cooking (WIN Television 2008–)
 Ben's Menu (Network Ten 2014–)
 Better Homes and Gardens (Seven Network 1995–, 7TWO 2014–)
 Cheese Slices (ABC 2008–)
 Compass (ABC 1998–)
 The Cook Up with Adam Liaw (SBS Food 2021–)
 Cook Like An Italian (SBS Food 2020–)
 Creek to Coast (Seven Network Queensland 2002–)
 Delish (Nine Network/9Life 2010–)
 Designing A Legacy (ABC 2021–)
 Destination WA (Nine Network)
 Dream Build (ABC 2012–)
 Dream Gardens (ABC 2017–)
 Escape from the City (ABC 2019–)
 Escape with ET (Nine Network 1997–2004, Network Ten 2005–)
 Everyday Gourmet with Justine Schofield (Network Ten 2011–)
 Fishing Australia (WIN Television 2001–)
 Freshly Picked with Simon Toohey (Network Ten 2020—)
 Further Back in Time for Dinner (ABC 2020)
 Gardening Australia (ABC 1990–)
 Getaway (Nine Network 1992–)
 Good Chef Bad Chef (Seven Network 2006–2007, Network Ten 2011–)
 Good Game: Spawn Point (ABC3 2010–)
 Grand Designs Australia (Lifestyle Channel 2010–)
 Helloworld (Nine Network 2018–2019, Seven Network 2019–)
 The Home Team (Network Ten 2014–)
 Hook, Line and Sinker (Southern Cross Tasmania 2001–, 7mate 2013–)
 Kitchen Cabinet (ABC 2012–2016, 2023–)
 Lee Rayner's Fishing Edge (Network Ten 2017—)
 The Living Room (Network Ten 2012–)
 Love It or List It (Lifestyle Channel 2017–)
 Luca's Key Ingredient (Network Ten 2021—)
 Luxe Listings Sydney (Amazon Prime 2021–)
 Luxury Escapes (Network Ten 2018–)
 Mass for You at Home (Network Ten 1971–2013, Network Ten/Eleven 2013–)
 Ready Set Reno (9Life 2017–)
 River to Reef (Foxtel/Southern Cross/C31/One 2005–)
 Selling Houses Australia (Lifestyle Channel 2008–)
 South Aussie with Cosi (Nine Network 2012–)
 Space Invaders (Nine Network 2021–)
 Undressed (Network Ten 2022–)
 Vasili's Garden (SBS 2007, Channel 31 2002–2007, 2008–2013, 7TWO 2016–)
 Weekender (Seven Network Queensland 2020–)

Music

 Rage (ABC 1987–)
 SBS PopAsia (SBS ONE 2011–2013, SBS2 2013–2016, SBS Viceland 2016–)
 The Sound (ABC 2020–)

News and current affairs

 10 News First (Network Ten 2018–)
 60 Minutes (Nine Network 1979–)
 7.30 (ABC 2011–)
 ABC News (ABC 1956–)
 ABC News At Five (ABC/ABC News 2018)
 ABC News Breakfast (ABC2 2008–2011, ABC News 24/ABC2 2010–11, ABC/ABC News 24 2011–)
 ABC News: Early Edition (ABC 2013–)
 ABC News Mornings (ABC News 24 2010–)
 ABC News with Ros Childs (ABC 2005–) (previously Midday Report) and World at Noon
 ABC Open (ABC News 24 2012–)
 Afternoon Live (ABC News 24 2010–)
 Agenda (Sky News Live)
 Australia Network News (ABC 2001–)
 Australia Wide (ABC News 24 2015–)
 Australian Agenda (Sky News Live)
 Australian Story (ABC 1995–)
 Behind the News (ABC 1969–2003, 2005–)
 The Bolt Report (Network Ten 2011–2015, Sky News Live 2016–)
 The Business (ABC 2012–)
 Catalyst (ABC 2001–)
 Credlin (Sky News Live 2017–)
 A Current Affair (Nine Network 1971–1978, 1988–)
 Dateline (SBS 1984–)
 The Drum (ABC 2012–, ABC News 24 2010–)
 The Feed (SBS2 2013–)
 First Edition (Sky News Live)
 Foreign Correspondent (ABC 1996–)
 Four Corners (ABC 1961–)
 The Friday Show (Sky News Live 2015–)
 Future Forum (ABC 2012–)
 Inside Story (Nine Network 2014–)
 Insiders (ABC 2001–)
 Insight (SBS 1995–)
 Jones + Co (Sky News 2016–)
 Landline (ABC 1992–)
 Living Black (SBS 2003–)
 Media Watch (ABC 1989–2000, 2002–)
 NBN News (NBN Television 1972–)
 News On 3 (ABC3 2009–)
 Nine News (Nine Network 2008–)
 Nine News Now (Nine Network 2013–)
 Nine's Afternoon News Hour (Nine Network 2004–)
 Nine's Early Morning News (Nine Network 2008–)
 Nine's Morning News (Nine Network 1981–)
 NITV News (NITV 2007–)
 Order in The House (ABC)
 Outsiders (Sky News Live 2016–)
 Paul Murray Live (Sky News Live 2010–)
 Planet America (ABC News 24 2012–)
 The Project (Network Ten 2009–), previously The 7PM Project (2009–2011)
 Q&A (ABC/ABC News 24 2008–)
 Question Time (Sky News Live)
 SBS World News Australia (SBS 2002–)
 Seven Afternoon News at 4 (Seven Network 2013–)
 Seven Early News (Seven Network 2008–)
 Seven Morning News (Seven Network 2000–)
 Seven News (Seven Network 2000–)
 Seven News With Mark Ferguson (Seven Sydney 2014–)
 Sky News (Sky News Live 1996–)
 Speers (Sky News Live 2018–)
 Sunrise (Seven Network 1991–1998, 2002–)
 Today (Nine Network 1982–)
 Weekend Breakfast (ABC News 24 2012–)
 Weekend Sunrise (Seven Network 2005–)
 Weekend Today (Nine Network 2009–)
 WIN News (WIN Television 1960–)
 The World (ABC News 24 2010–)
 The World This Week (ABC News 24 2010–)
 World Watch (SBS 1993–)

Reality

 The Amazing Race Australia (Seven Network 2011–2014, Network Ten 2019—)
 Australia's Got Talent (Seven Network 2007–2012, Nine Network 2013, 2016, Seven Network 2019–)
 Australian Survivor (Nine Network 2002, Seven Network 2006, Network Ten 2016–)
 The Bachelor Australia (Network Ten 2013–)
 The Block (Nine Network 2003–)
 The Bridge Australia (Paramount* 2022–)
 Byron Baes (Netflix 2022)
 Dishing It Up (SBS 2022–)
 Family Rules (NITV 2017–)
 The Farmer Wants a Wife (Nine Network 2007–2012, 2016, Seven Network 2020–)
 Filthy Rich and Homeless (SBS 2017–)
 Hunted (Network Ten 2022–)
 I'm a Celebrity...Get Me Out of Here! (Network Ten 2015–)
 Lego Masters (Nine Network 2019–)
 Married at First Sight (Nine Network 2015–)
 The Masked Singer (Network Ten 2019—)
 MasterChef Australia (Network Ten 2009–)
 Mates on a Mission (Seven Network 2022) 
 Maxim TV (Network Ten/One 2014, 7mate 2018–)
 Mirror, Mirror (Network Ten 2021—)
 Parental Guidance (reality Nine Network 2021–) 
 The Real Love Boat (Network Ten 2022–)
 SAS Australia (Seven Network 2020–)
 Snackmasters (reality Nine Network 2022–) 
 The Traitors (Network Ten 2022–)
 Travel Guides (Nine Network 2017–)
 The Voice (Nine Network 2012–2020, Seven Network 2021–)
 Wife Swap (Lifestyle 2012–2013, Seven Network 2021–)
 Neighbors ( Network TEN 2022-) Amazon Prime 2023

Special events

 AACTA Awards (Network Ten 2012–)
 Antenna Awards (Channel 31 2004–)
 APRA Awards (Foxtel)
 ARIA Awards (Network Ten 1992–2000, 2002–2008, 2010, 2014–2016, Nine Network 2001, 2009, 2017– 9Go! 2011–2013)
 Australia Day Live Concert (ABC 2004–2011, Network Ten 2012–2018, ABC 2019–)
 Carols by Candlelight (Nine Network 1952–)
 Carols in the City (Nine Network 1970s–2008, Network Ten 2009–)
 Carols in the Domain (Seven Sydney/Disney Channel 1982–)
 Channel Seven Perth Telethon (Seven Perth)
 Creative Generation (Network Ten 2005–)
 Gold Week Telethon (Nine Sydney)
 Good Friday Appeal (Seven Melbourne 1957–)
 Schools Spectacular (ABC 1985–2012, Nine Network 2013–2015, Seven Network 2016–2019, 2021)
 Sydney Gay and Lesbian Mardi Gras (ABC 1994–1996, 2022–, Network Ten 1997–1999, SBS 2014–2021)
 Sydney New Year's Eve Fireworks (Nine Network 1995–2006, Network Ten 2006–2008, Nine Network 2009–2013, ABC 2013–)
 TV Week Logie Awards (ABC 1961–1965, Seven Network 1989–1995, 2023–, Nine Network 1959–2022, Network TEN 1981–1993)

Soap operas
 Home and Away (Seven Network 1988–)
 Neighbours (Seven Network 1985, Network Ten 1986–2010, 10 Peach 2011–2022, Amazon 2023-)

Sport

Does not include sport broadcasts themselves
 100% Footy (Nine Network 2018–)
 ABC Sport (ABC)
 AFL 360 (Fox Sports 2011–)
 AFL Game Day (Seven Network 2008–)
 A-Leagues All Access (Network Ten 2022–)
 The Back Page (FOX Sports 1997–)
 The Barefoot Rugby League Show (NITV)
 Barefoot Sports (NITV)
 Bill & Boz (FOX Sports 2017–)
 The Cricket Show (Cricket) (Nine Network 1997–2018)
 Cycling Central (Cycling) (SBS 2003–2007, 2010–)
 The Fan (Fox League 2017–)
 The FIFA World Cup Show (Football) (SBS)
 Fight Call Out (Foxtel)
 Fight Week: Training Grounds (Foxtel 2016)
 Footy Classified (AFL) (Nine Network 2007–) (except NSW and QLD)
 The Footy Fix (Seven Network)
 Footy QLD (NRL) (Nine Network)
 Footy SA (AFL) (Nine Network)
 Footy WA (AFL) (Nine Network)
 The Front Bar (Seven Network 2016–)
 The Golf Show (FOX Sports)
 Grandstand (ABC News 24 2012–)
 Inside Cricket (FOX Sports)
 Inside Rugby (FOX Sports)
 Inside Supercars (FOX Sports 2015–) 
 The Late Show with Matty Johns (Fox League 2017–)
 The Lawn Bowls Show (Channel 31 2006–)
 The Marngrook Footy Show
 The Night Watchmen (Fox Cricket 2018–)
 Nine's Wide World of Sports (Nine Network 1981–)
 NITV Sport (NITV)
 NRL 360 (Fox Sports 2013–)
 NRL on FOX (FOX Sports 2009–)
 Offsiders (ABC 2006–)
 Olympics on Seven (Seven Network/7TWO/7mate 1992–2008, 2016–present)
 Over The Black Dot
 Pardon the Interruption Australia (ESPN Australia 2004–)
 The Professor's Farewell Tour (Fox League 2017–)
 Round Ball Rules (Network Ten 2022–)
 Rugby 360 (Fox Sports 2016–) 
 SBS Speedweek (Motorsport) (SBS)
 SBS Sport (SBS)
 Seven Sport (Seven Network 1999)
 Shannons Legends of Motorsport (7mate 2014–)
 Sports Lounge (Australia Plus TV)
 Sports Sunday (Nine Network 2017–)
 The Sunday Footy Show (AFL) (Nine Network 1993–)
 The Sunday Footy Show (NRL) (Nine Network 1993–)
 Sunday Night with Matty Johns (Fox League 2017–)
 The Sunday Roast (NRL) (Nine Network 2005–)
 Supercars Life (FOX Sports 2015–)
 TAC Cup Future Stars (Nine Network 2009–)
 Talking Footy (Seven Network 2013–)
 Ten Sport (Network Ten 2001)
 Total Football (FOX Sports)
 UFC Fight Week (Foxtel)
 Wide World of Sports (Nine Network 1981–1999, 2008–)
 Women's Footy (Nine Network 2017–)
 The World Game (Football) (SBS 2001–)

Talk and variety

 20 to 1 (Nine Network 2005–2011, 2016–)
 The ABC Of (ABC 2022–)
 The Bolt Report (Network Ten 2011–2015, Sky News Live 2016–)
 Frankly (ABC 2022–)
 The Morning Show (Network Ten with Bert Newton 1992, Seven Network 2007–)
 National Press Club Address (ABC)
 One Plus One (ABC 2010–)
 Take 5 with Zan Rowe (ABC 2022–)
 The Project (Network Ten 2009–), previously The 7PM Project
 Studio 10 (Network Ten 2013–)
 Today Extra (Nine Network 2016–)

Production ended

Arts and culture

 Art Nation (ABC 2010–2011)
 The Arts Show (ABC 1999–2001)
 Artscape (ABC 2011)
 At the Movies (ABC 2004–2014)
 The Bazura Project (Channel 31 2006–2008) (ABC2 2011)
 Big Ideas (ABC 2010–2014)
 The Book Club formerly First Tuesday Book Club (ABC 2006–2017)
 Critical Mass (ABC 2014)
 E! News (Network Ten 1998–2001)
 The Exhibitionists (ABC 2022)
 Fashionista (SBS 2003–2005)
 Hannah Gadsby's Oz (ABC 2014)
 The Mix (ABC 2014–2021)
 Movie Guide (HSV-7 1958–1959)
 Movie Juice (Network Ten 2014–2015, Nine Network 2017–2018)
 The Movie Show (SBS 1986–2006, 2007–2008)
 Myf Warhurst's Nice (ABC 2012)
 Next Stop Hollywood (ABC 2013)
 Sunday Arts (ABC 2006–2009)
 Tiny Oz (ABC 2022)

Children, teens and family

 Active Kidz (ABC 2004)
 Adventure Island (ABC 1967–1972)
 The Adventures of Blinky Bill (ABC 1993)
 The Adventures of Bottle Top Bill and His Best Friend Corky (ABC 2009)
 The Adventures of the Bush Patrol (Seven Network 1996–1998)
 The Adventures of Long John Silver (ABC 1958)
 The Adventures of Sam (ABC 1997)
 Adventures of the Seaspray (ABC 1967)
 The Adventures of Sebastian the Fox (ABC 1963)
 The Adventures of Skippy (Nine Network 1992)
 The Adventures of the Terrible Ten (Nine Network 1959–1960)
 Adventures on Kythera (Nine Network 1991–1992)
 The Afternoon Show (ABC)
 Agro's Cartoon Connection (Seven Network BTQ/ATN 1989–1997)
 Alexander Bunyip's Billabong (ABC 1978–1988)
 All for Kids (Seven Network 2008–2009)
 Alpha Scorpio (ABC 1974)
 A*mazing (Seven Network 1994–1998)
 Andra (ABC 1976)
 Animal Park (Seven Network 1991)
 Arthur! and the Square Knights of the Round Table (cartoon series) (ABC 1966–1968)
 As the Bell Rings (Disney Channel 2007–2011)
 Baby Animals in Our World (Eleven 2016–2017)
 Backyard Science (ABC/Seven Network 2004–2008)
 The Ballad of Riverboat Bill (ABC 1965)
 Bambaloo (Seven Network 2003–2007)
 Bananas in Pyjamas (ABC 1992–2002)
 Bananas in Pyjamas (animated) (ABC4Kids 2011–2012)
 Bang Goes the Budgie (ABC 1985)
 Bay City (Seven Network 1993)
 Beat Bugs (7TWO 2016–2018)
 The Big Arvo (Seven Network 2001–2004)
 The Big Breakfast (Network Ten 1992–1995)
 The Big Cheez (Network Ten 1998–2005)
 Big Square Eye (ABC 1991–1992)
 Bindi the Jungle Girl (ABC 2007–2008)
 Bindi's Bootcamp (ABC 2012–2015)
 Blue Water High (ABC 2005–2008)
 Blue Zoo (ABC3 2014)
 Boffins (ABC 1994)
 The Book Place (Seven Network 1991–2003)
 Bootleg (ABC 2002)
 Born to Spy (ABC ME 2021)  
 Bottersnikes and Gumbles (7TWO 2015–2016)
 Bright Sparks (1989)
 Bubble Bath Bay (ABC2 2015–2016)
 The Bureau of Magical Things (10 Peach 2018, 10 Shake 2020)
 The Bush Gang (ABC 1981)
 Bushwhacked! (ABC ME 2012–2017)
 Bunyip (ABC 1987)
 Butterfly Island (ABC 1985, Seven Network 1985–1987)
 C/o The Bartons (ABC 1988)
 Captain Flinn and the Pirate Dinosaurs (9Go! 2015)
 Captain Fortune Show (Seven Network 1957)
 The Cartoon Company (Nine Network 1986–1991)
 Castaway (Seven Network 2011)
 Catch Kandy (Seven Network 1973)
 Challenger (Nine Network 1997–1998)
 Channel Niners (Nine Network 1983–1985)
 Cheez TV (Network Ten 1995–2005)
 Chuck Finn (Seven Network 1999–2000) 
 CJ the DJ (ABC3 2009–2010)
 Clowning Around (Seven Network 1992–1993)
 C'mon Kids (Nine Network 1986–1990)
 Colour in the Creek (Nine Network 1985)
 Come Midnight Monday (ABC 1982)
 Cooking for Kids with Luis (Nick Jr. 2004–2005)
 The Coral Island (ABC 2000)
 Couch Potato (ABC 1991–2005)
 Count Us In (ABC 1999–2000)
 Crash Zone (Seven Network 1999–2001)
 Creature Features (ABC 2002–2008)
 The Crew formerly known as School Torque (SBS 2013–2014)
 Crocamole (Eleven 2016–2017)
 Crunch Time (9Go! 2016–2018)
 The Curiosity Show (Nine Network 1972–1990)
 Cushion Kids (Nine Network 2001)
 Cybergirl (Network Ten/ABC 2001–2002)
 Dance Academy (ABC3 2010–2013)
 The Daryl and Ossie Cartoon Show (Nine Network 1976–1978)
 The Day My Butt Went Psycho! (9Go! 2013–2015)
 Dead Gorgeous (ABC 2010)
 Deadly (Nine Network 2006–2009)
 The Deep (7TWO/ABC 2015–2019)
 Desmond and the Channel 9-Pins (TCN-9 1957–1962)
 Dex Hamilton: Alien Entomologist (Network Ten 2008–2009)
 Didi and B. (Nickelodeon 2012–2013)
 dirtgirlworld (ABC2 2009)
 Dogstar (Nine Network 2008)
 Don't Blame The Koalas (Nine Network 2002–2003)
 Dorothy the Dinosaur (ABC4Kids 2007–2010)
 Double Trouble (Nine Network 2008)
 Download (Nine Network 2000–2002)
 Driven Crazy (1998)
 A Drop In The Ocean (ABC 1972)
 Drunk History Australia (Network Ten 2020)
 The Early Bird Show (Network Ten 1984–1989)
 Earthwatch (ABC 1980)
 The Eggs (Nine Network 2004)
 The Elephant Princess (Network Ten 2008–2011)
 Elly & Jools (Nine Network 1990)
 Erky Perky (Seven Network 2006–2009)
 Escape from Jupiter (1994) and Return to Jupiter (1997)
 Escape of the Artful Dodger (Nine Network 2001)
 Eugénie Sandler P.I. (ABC 2000)
 The Experimentals (ABC 2014)
 The Fairies (ABC 2000 (Vintage VHS series), Seven Network 2005–2009 (TV series))
 Falcon Island (Nine Network 1981)
 Fame and Misfortune (ABC 1986)
 Fanshaw & Crudnut (9Go! 2017)
 Fat Cat and Friends (Network Ten 1972–1987, Seven Network 1987–1992)
 Fatty and George (ABC 1981)
 Feral TV (ABC 1995)
 The Ferals (ABC 1994–1995)
 Fergus McPhail (Network Ten 2004)
 Ferry Boat Fred (ABC 1992)
 Finders Keepers (Network Ten 1991–1992) (also known as The Finder)
 Five Minutes More (ABC 2006)
 Five Times Dizzy (Nine Network 1986)
 The Flamin' Thongs (ABC3 2014)
 Flipper & Lopaka (Seven Network 1999–2005)
 Flushed (7TWO 2015–2016)
 The Flying Dogtor (1962–1964)
 For Real (10 Shake 2020)
 Foreign Exchange (Nine Network 2004)
 Frank and Francesca (ABC 1973)
 Fredd Bear's Breakfast-A-Go-Go (Network Ten 1969–1971)
 Fun Farm (TCN-9 1956–1957)
 G2G (Nine Network 2008)
 The Gamers 2037 (9Go! 2020)
 Gardening for Kids with Madi (Nick Jr. 2006–2008)
 The Genie From Down Under (ABC 1996–1998)
 Get Ace (Eleven 2014)
 Get Arty (7TWO 2017–2020)
 Get Clever (7TWO 2018–2020)
 The Gift (Nine Network 1997)
 Giggle and Hoot (ABC4Kids/ABC Kids 2009–2020)
 The Girl from Tomorrow (Nine Network 1991–1992)
 Girl TV (Seven Network 2003–2004)
 Glad Rags (Nine Network 1995)
 Golden Pennies (ABC 1985)
 Good Game (ABC 2006–2016)
 Good Morning!!! (Network Ten 1967–1971)
 Goodsports (WIN, Nine Network 1991–2000)
 Grace Beside Me (NITV/ABC ME 2018)
 Guinevere Jones (Network Ten 2002)
 A gURLs wURLd (Nine Network 2011)
 H2O: Just Add Water (Network Ten/Disney Channel 2006–2010)
 Hairy Legs (7TWO 2014)
 Halfway Across the Galaxy and Turn Left (Seven Network 1991–1992)
 Hanging With (Disney 2013–2019)
 Happy Go 'Round (Nine Network 1970s)
 Hardball (ABC ME 2019–2021)
 Haydaze (Network Ten 1990)
 The Henderson Kids (Network Ten 1985–1987)
 Here's Humphrey (Nine Network 1965–2009)
 High Flyers (Network Ten 1999)
 Hi-5 (Nine Network 1999–2011, 9Go! 2017–2018)
 Hi-5 House (Nick Jr. 2013–2016, Eleven 2014)
 Hiccup and Sneeze (9Go! 2017–2018)
 Hills End (ABC 1989)
 Holly's Heroes (Nine Network 2005)
 Home (ABC 1983)
 The Hooley Dooleys (ABC 1996–2009)
 Gamify (10 Peach 2019)
 Hoot Hoot Go! (ABC2 2016)
 Horace and Tina (Network Ten 2001)
 Hot Source (Nine Network 2003–2006)
 Hunter (ABC 1984–1985)
 I Got a Rocket (Network Ten 2006–2007)
 Imagination Train (9Go! 2015–2017)
 In the Box (Network Ten 1998–2006)
 In Your Dreams (7TWO 2013–14)
 The InBESTigators (ABC ME 2019–2020)
 Infinity Limited (ABC 1980)
 The Interpretaris (ABC 1966)
 Itch (ABC ME 2020–2021) 
 It's Academic (Network Ten 1968–69, Seven Network 1970–78, 2005–12, 7TWO 2013–16)
 Jar Dwellers SOS (Eleven 2013–2014)
 Jarjums (NITV 2013–2015)
 Jass Time (KidsCo 2009)
 Jay's Jungle (7TWO 2015–2018)
 Johnson and Friends (ABC 1990–1995)
 The Judy Jack Show (HSV-7 1956–1957)
 Just 4 Fun (Southern Cross 1976–1978)
 K-9 (Network Ten 2009–2010)
 Kaboodle (ABC 1987–1990)
 Kangaroo Creek Gang (Nine Network 2002)
 Kelly (Network Ten 1991)
 Kid Detectives (Seven Network 2009)
 Kids Only (Nine Network 1986–1988)
 Kids' WB (Nine Network 2006–09, Nine Network/9Go! 2009–12, 9Go! 2013–2019)
 The Kingdom of Paramithi (Nine Network/Nick Jr. 2008)
 Kitchen Whiz (Nine Network 2011–2012, 9Go! 2013–2015)
 KTV (TasTV)
 Kuu Kuu Harajuku (10 Peach 2015–2019)
 Lab Rats Challenge (Nine Network 2008, Seven Network 2012, ABC3 2013–2014)
 Lah-Lah's Adventures (7TWO 2014)
 Lah-Lah's Big Live Band (7TWO 2009)
 Larry the Lawnmower (Seven Network 2008–10)
 Larry the Wonderpup (7TWO 2018)
 Legacy of the Silver Shadow (Network Ten 2002)
 Lexi & Lottie: Trusty Twin Detectives (10 Peach 2016–2017)
 Lift Off (ABC 1992–1995)
 Lightning Point (Network Ten 2012)
 Li'l Elvis and the Truckstoppers (ABC 1997–1998)
 Li'l Horrors (Seven Network 2001)
 The Listies Work For Peanuts (ABC ME 2019)
 Little J & Big Cuz (NITV 2017)
 Little Lunch (ABC3 2015)
 Lizzie's Library (ABC 1995)
 Lockie Leonard (Nine Network 2007–2011)
 The Lost Islands (Network Ten 1976)
 The Magic Boomerang (ABC 1965–1966)
 Magic Circle Club (ABC 1966)
 Magic Mountain (ABC 1997–1998)
 Mako: Island of Secrets (Network Ten 2013, Eleven 2013–2016)
 Mal.com (ABC 2011)
 Master Raindrop (Seven Network 2009)
 Match It (Seven Network 2012, 7TWO 2013–14)
 Match Mates (Nine Network 1981–1982)
 Me and My Monsters (Network Ten/Nickelodeon/BBC 2010–2011)
 Mind Over Maddie (Disney Channel 2013)
 Minty (ABC 1998)
 The Miraculous Mellops (Network Ten 1991–1992)
 Mirror, Mirror (Network Ten 1995) (Australian/New Zealand co-production)
 Mirror, Mirror II (Nine Network 1997–1998) (Australian/New Zealand co-production)
 Misery Guts (Nine Network 1998)
 Mission Top Secret (Seven Network 1991 telemovie, Network Ten 1994–1995)
 Mixy (ABC 1998–2002)
 Mortified (Nine Network 2006–2007)
 Move It (9Go! 2014–2018)
 Mr. Squiggle (ABC 1959–1999)
 Mulligrubs (Network Ten 1988–1996)
 The Music Shop (Network Ten 1996–1998)
 Mustangs FC (ABC ME 2017–2020)
 My Generation (Nine Network 1995–1996)
 My Great Big Adventure (ABC3 2012)
 My Place (ABC3 2009–2011)
 The Mystery of Black Rose Castle (ABC 2001)
 The Nargun and the Stars (ABC 1981)
 Nate is Late (9Go! 2018–)
 The New Adventures of Blinky Bill (ABC 1984–1987)
 The New Adventures of Ocean Girl (Network Ten 2000)
 New MacDonald's Farm (Nine Network/ABC 2004–2007)
 News of the Wild (7TWO 2018–2019)
 News to Me (ABC ME 2016–2017)
 Noah and Saskia (ABC 2004)
 Now You See It (Seven Network 1985–1993, Nine Network 1998–2000)
 Nowhere Boys (ABC3/ABC ME 2013–2018)
 Numbers Count (ABC)
 Ocean Girl (Network Ten 1994–1998)
 Ocean Star (Network Ten 2003)
 Ocean Star: the Quest (Network Ten 2002)
 Oh Yuck! (7TWO 2017–2019)
 Old Tom (ABC 2001)
 Once Upon a Dream (Network Ten 2012)
 Our Animals (ABC)
 Out There (ABC 2003–2004)
 Outback 8 (Network Ten 2008)
 Outriders (Nine Network 2001)
 Parallax (ABC/Nine Network 2004)
 Pearlie (Network Ten 2009)
 Penelope K, by the way (Cbeebies 2010–2012)
 Petals (ABC 1998–1999)
 Peters Club (GTV-9 1958?)
 Phoenix Five (ABC 1969–1970)
 Pig's Breakfast (Nine Network 1999)
 Pipsqueaks (7TWO 2013)
 Pirate Express (9Go! 2015)
 Pirate Islands (Network Ten 2003, 2007)
 Pixel Pinkie (Nine Network 2009)
 Play Along with Sam (Nick Jr. 2012–2014)
 Playhouse Disney (Seven Network 2003–2007)
 Prank Patrol (ABC 2009–)
 Prisoner Zero (TV series) (ABC3 2016)
 Professor Poopsnagle's Steam Zeppelin (Nine Network 1986)
 Pugwall (Nine Network 1989–1991)
 Puzzle Play (Network Ten 2006–2011)
 Pyramid (Nine Network 2009–2012, 9Go! 2013–2014)
 Raggs (Seven Network 2006–2009, 7TWO 2008–2012)
 Random and Whacky (Eleven 2017–2020)
 Ready For This (ABC3 2015)
 Ready, Steady, Wiggle! (ABC4Kids/Disney Junior 2013–2015, 2021)
 Return to Jupiter (ABC 1997)
 Ridgey Didge (Network Ten 1987–1989)
 Rollercoaster (ABC 2005–2010)
 Romper Room (Seven Network 1963–1988)
 Round the Twist (Seven Network 1989, ABC 1992–2001)
 The Rovers (Network Ten 1969–1970)
 The Saddle Club (ABC 2001–2004, Nine Network 2009–2010)
 Sam Fox: Extreme Adventures (Eleven 2014)
 Sarvo (Nickelodeon 2003–2007)
 Saturday Disney (Seven Network 1990–2012, Seven Network/7TWO 2012–16, Seven Network/7flix 2016)
 Saturdee (1986)
 Scooter: Secret Agent (Network Ten 2005)
 Scope (Network Ten 2005–13, 10 Peach 2013–2020, 10 Shake 2020–2021)
 Search for Treasure Island (Seven Network 1998,2000)
 Secret Valley (ABC 1980, 1984)
 Seven Little Australians (ABC 1973)
 The Shak (Nine Network 2006–2009)
 The Shak at Home (Nine Network 2009–2010)
 The Shapies (Nine Network 2002)
 Sharky's Friends (Nine Network 2007–2008)
 Sherazade: The Untold Stories (10 Peach 2017–18)
 SheZow (Network Ten 2012–2013)
 Ship to Shore (Nine Network 1993–1996)
 Shirl's Neighbourhood (Seven Network 1979–1983)
 Short Cuts (Seven Network 2001)
 The Silver Brumby (Network Ten 1996–1998)
 Silversun (ABC/Seven Network 2004)
 Simon Townsend's Wonder World (Network Ten 1979–1986)
 The Skinner Boys: Guardians of the Lost Secrets (9Go! 2014–2017)
 Skippy: Adventures in Bushtown (Nine Network 1998)
 Skippy the Bush Kangaroo (Nine Network 1966–1968)
 Sky Trackers (Seven Network 1994)
 The Sleepover Club (Nine Network 2003–2008)
 Smugglers Beware (ABC 1963)
 Snake Tales (Nine Network 2009)
 Snobs (Nine Network 2003) 
 Space Chickens in Space (9Go! 2018–2019)
 Spellbinder (Australian/Polish co-production) (Nine Network 1995)
 Spellbinder: Land of the Dragon Lord (Australian/Polish/Chinese co-production) (Nine Network 1997)
 Spit It Out (Seven Network 2010–11)
 Staines Down Drains (2006–2011)
 Star Space with Adam Saunders (ABC 2008)
 Stay Tuned (ABC3 2011–2012)
 Steam Punks! (ABC3 2013–2014)
 Stormworld (Nine Network/ABC 2010)
 The Stranger (ABC 1964–1965)
 Streetsmartz (Nine Network 2005–2006)
 Studio 3 (ABC3 2009–2016)
 Sugar and Spice (ABC TV 1988–1989)
 Super Flying Fun Show (Nine Network 1970–1980)
 Surprises! (Nine Network 2012, 9Go! 2013–2014)
 Swap Shop (ABC 1988–1989)
 Sweat (Network Ten 1996)
 Swinging (ABC 1997)
 Tabaluga (Seven Network 1997–2004)
 Take on Technology (ABC)
 Tarax Show (GTV-9 1957–1969)
 Tashi (ABC/7TWO 2014–16)
 Teddies (9Go! 2017–2018)
 Teenage Fairytale Dropouts (Seven Network/7TWO 2012–2013)
 The Terrific Adventures of the Terrible Ten and The Ten Again (1960,1964)
 Thunderstone (Network Ten 1999–2001)
 Time For Kids (RTS-5A Riverland)
 Time Trackers (Seven Network 2008)
 Toasted TV (Network Ten 2005–12, 10 Peach 2012–2020)
 Tomorrow, When the War Began (ABC3 2016)
 Total Recall (Seven Network 1994–1995)
 Totally Australia (Network Ten 1997–2008)
 Totally Wild (Network Ten 1992–2013, 10 Peach 2013–2020, 10 Shake 2020–2021)
 Touch the Sun (ABC 1988)
 Toybox (Seven Network 2010–12, 7TWO 2013–14)
 Tracey McBean (ABC 2001)
 Trapped (Seven Network 2008)
 ttn (Network Ten 2004–2008)
 The Unlisted (ABC ME 2019)
 The Upside Down Show (Nick Jr. 2006)
 Vega 4 (ABC 1968)
 Vic the Viking (Network Ten/Eleven 2013–2015)
 Vidiot (ABC 1992–1995)
 Wandjina! (ABC 1966)
 Watch This Space (ABC 1982)
 The Wayne Manifesto (ABC 1996)
 What Do You Know? (ABC3 2010)
 What's Up Doc? (Nine Network 1991–1999)
 Wicked Science (Network Ten 2004–2006)
 Wiggle and Learn (ABC 2008)
 The Wiggles (Seven Network/ABC Television Disney Channel/Playhouse Disney 1998–2008)
 Wiggly Waffle (ABC 2009–2012)
 The Wild Adventures of Blinky Bill (7TWO 2016–2017)
 Wild Kat (Network Ten 2001)
 William & Sparkles' Magical Tales (Nine Network 2010–2012, 9Go! 2013–2016)
 Wombat (Seven Network 1983–1988)
 Woobinda (Animal Doctor) (ABC/Nine Network 1968–1969)
 Wormwood (Network Ten/ABC 2007)
 Worst Best Friends (Network Ten 2002)
 The Worst Day of My Life (ABC 1991–1992)
 Worst Year of My Life Again (ABC3 2014)
 Wurrawhy (Network Ten 2011–2013, Eleven 2013–2016)
 Y? (Nine Network 1999)
 Yakkity Yak (Nickelodeon 2002–2003)
 Young Seven (HSV-7 1957–1960)
 You're Skitting Me (ABC3 2012–2016)
 Zoo Family (Nine Network 1985)

Comedy 

 30 Seconds (Comedy Channel 2009)
 8MMM Aboriginal Radio (ABC 2015)
 Acropolis Now (Seven Network ATN 1989–1992)
 The Adventures of Lano and Woodley (ABC 1997–1999)
 AFHV: World's Funniest Videos (Nine Network 2009)
 After the Beep (ABC 1995)
 All Aussie Adventures (Network Ten 2001–2003, 2018)
 All Together Now (Nine Network 1991–1994)
 Alvin Purple (ABC 1976)
 And the Big Men Fly (ABC 1974)
 Angry Boys (ABC 2011)
 Are You Being Served? (Network Ten 1980–1981)
 At Home Alone Together (ABC 2020)
 At Home With Julia (ABC 2011)
 Audrey's Kitchen (ABC 2012–2013)
 Aunty Donna's Big Ol' House of Fun (Netflix 2020)
 The Aunty Jack Show (ABC 1972–1973)
 Australia You're Standing In It (ABC 1983–1984)
 Australia's Sexiest Tradie (7mate 2021)
 Back in Very Small Business (ABC 2018)
 Back Seat Drivers (ABC 2014)
 BackBerner (ABC 1999–2002)
 Bachelor Gaye (Nine Network 1971)
 Bad Cop, Bad Cop (ABC 2002)
 Barley Charlie (Nine Network 1964)
 Beached Az (ABC 2009)
 Ben Elton Live From Planet Earth (Nine Network 2011)
 Big Bite (Seven Network 2003)
 The Big Gig (ABC 1989–1991)
 Big Girl's Blouse (Seven Network 1994)
 Bingles (Network Ten 1992–1993)
 Birds in the Bush (Seven Network 1972) (co-produced with the BBC in UK)
 Black Comedy (ABC 2014–2020)
 Blah Blah Blah (ABC 1988)
 The Bob Morrison Show (Nine Network 1994)
 Bobby Dazzler (Seven Network 1977–1978)
 Bogan Hunters (7mate 2014)
 Bogan Pride (SBS 2008)
 Brass Monkeys (Seven Network 1983)
 Bullpitt! (Seven Network 1997–1998)
 Caravan of Courage (Network Ten 2007–2010, Nine Network 2012)
 Chandon Pictures (Movie Extra/ABC 2007–2008)
 The Chaser Decides (ABC 2004)
 Chaser News Alert (ABC2 2005)
 The Chaser's Election Desk (ABC 2016)
 The Chaser's Media Circus (ABC 2014–2016)
 The Chaser's War on Everything (ABC 2006–2009)
 The Checkout (ABC 2013–2018)
 Chop-Socky's The Prison of Art (Foxtel 1999)
 The Cleanists (Showcase 2013–2014)
 CNNNN (ABC 2002–2003)
 The Comedy Company (Network Ten 1988–1990)
 The Comedy Game (ABC 1971–1973)
 Comedy Inc. (Nine Network 2003–2007)
 The Comedy Sale (Seven Network 1993)
 Comedy Showroom (ABC 2016)
 Comedy Slapdown (Comedy Channel 2008)
 Commercial Breakdown (Nine Network 2007–2009)
 The Company Men (ABC 1975)
 Corridors of Power (ABC 2001)
 Cuckoo in the Nest (Seven Network 1978)
 The D-Generation (ABC 1986–1987, Seven Network 1988–1989)
 DAAS Kapital (ABC 1991–1992)
 Daily at Dawn (Seven Network 1981)
 Danger 5 (SBS 2012–2015)
 The Dave & Kerley Show (V Channel 2008)
 Dave in the Life (SBS 2009–2010)
 Die On Your Feet (One 2014)
 Dirty Laundry Live (ABC2 2013–2014, ABC 2015)
 The Divorce (ABC 2015)
 Dog's Head Bay (ABC 1999)
 Dossa and Joe (ABC 2002)
 Double the Fist (ABC 2004–2008)
 Double Take (Seven Network 2009)
 Download (Network Ten 2007–2008)
 Eagle & Evans (ABC 2004–2005)
 Effie, Just Quietly (SBS 2001)
 Eggshells (ABC 1991–1993)
 The Election Chaser (ABC 2001)
 The Elegant Gentleman's Guide to Knife Fighting (ABC 2013)
 The Eric Bana Show Live (Seven Network 1997)
 The Ex-PM (ABC 2015–2017)
 The Family Law (SBS 2016–2019)
 Fancy Boy (ABC2 2016)
 Fast Forward (Seven Network 1989–1992)
 Fat Pizza: Back in Business (7mate 2019) 
 Flat Chat (Nine Network 2001)
 Flipside (ABC 2002)
 Fresh Blood (ABC 2015–2018)
 Frontline (ABC 1994–1995, 1997)
 Full Frontal (Seven Network 1993–1997, Network Ten 1998–1999)
 Fun with Frith (HSV-7 1957)
 Funky Squad (ABC 1995)
 The Games (ABC 1998–2000)
 Get Krack!n (ABC 2017–2019)
 Gillies and Company (ABC 1992)
 The Gillies Report (ABC 1984–1985)
 The Gillies Republic (ABC 1986)
 Good Morning Mr Doubleday (ABC 1969)
 Good News Week (ABC 1996–1998, Network Ten 1999–2000, 2008–2011)
 Good News World (Network Ten 2011)
 Grass Roots (ABC 2000–2003)
 The Group (Seven Network 1971)
 Growing Up Gracefully (ABC 2017)
 Gruen Nation (ABC 2010, 2013)
 Gruen Planet (ABC 2011–2013)
 Gruen Sweat (ABC 2012)
 The Gruen Transfer (ABC 2008–2011)
 Hamish & Andy (Seven Network 2004)
 Hamish and Andy's Gap Year (Nine Network 2011–2014)
 Hamish and Andy's “Perfect” Holiday (Nine Network 2019)
 Hampton Court (Seven Network 1991)
 The Hamster Decides (ABC 2013)
 The Hamster Wheel (ABC 2011–2014)
 Here Come the Habibs (Nine Network 2016–2017)
 Here's Dawn (Nine Network 1964–1965)
 Hey Dad..! (Seven Network 1984–1994)
 Hey You! (Seven Network and Nine Network 1967)
 The Hollowmen (ABC 2008)
 House Gang (SBS 1996)
 Housos (SBS 2011–2013)
 Housos vs. Virus – The Lockdown (7mate 2020)
 How Not to Behave (ABC 2015)
 How the Quest Was Won (ABC 2004–2005)
 How to Stay Married (Network Ten 2018–2021)
 Hughesy, We Have a Problem (Network Ten 2018–2021)
 I Rock (ABC2 2010)
 In Harmer's Way (ABC 1990)
 Introducing Gary Petty (The Comedy Channel 2000)
 It's a Date (ABC 2013–2014)
 I've Married A Bachelor (ABC 1968–1969)
 Ja'mie: Private School Girl (ABC 2013)
 The Jesters (Movie Extra 2009–2011)
 Jimeoin (Seven Network 1994–1995)
 Joan and Leslie (Seven Network 1969)
 John Safran vs God (SBS 2004)
 John Safran's Music Jamboree (SBS 2002)
 John Safran's Race Relations (ABC 2009)
 Jonah from Tonga (ABC 2014)
 The Joy of Sets (Nine Network 2011)
 Judith Lucy Is All Woman (ABC 2015)
 Judith Lucy's Spiritual Journey (ABC 2011)
 Just for Laughs (Nine Network 2007)
 Just Kidding! (Nine Network 1993–1996)
 The Katering Show (ABC 2015–2016)
 Kath & Kim (ABC 2002–2004, Seven Network 2007)
 Kenny's World (Network Ten 2008)
 Kick (SBS 2007)
 Kidspeak (Seven Network 1998)
 Kiki and Kitty (ABC Comedy 2017)
 Kingswood Country (Seven Network 1980–1984)
 Kinne (7mate 2014–2015)
 Kinne Tonight (Network Ten 2018–2019)
 Kittson Fahey (ABC 1992–1993)
 Laid (ABC 2011–2012)
 The Last of the Australians (Nine Network 1975)
 Late For School (Network Ten 1992)
 The Late Show (ABC 1992–1993)
 Lawrence Leung's Choose Your Own Adventure (ABC 2009)
 Lawrence Leung's Unbelievable (ABC 2011)
 Legally Brown (SBS 2013–2014)
 Leongatha (Channel 31 2013)
 Let the Blood Run Free (Network Ten 1990–1994)
 Let Loose Live (Seven Network 2005)
 The Letdown (ABC 2017–2019)
 Let's Talk About (Presto/Foxtel 2015–2017)
 The Librarians (ABC 2007–2010)
 Life Support (SBS 2004)
 LOL: Last One Laughing (Apple TV+ 2020)
 Look and Laugh (ATN-7 1958–1959)
 Lowdown (ABC 2010–2013)
 Luke Warm Sex (ABC 2016)
 Lunatics (Netflix 2019)
 Magda's Funny Bits (Nine Network 2006)
 The Mansion (Comedy Channel 2008)
 Mark Loves Sharon (Network Ten 2008)
 Marx and Venus (SBS 2007)
 The Mavis Bramston Show (Seven Network 1964)
 Maximum Choppage (ABC2 2015)
 The Merrick & Rosso Show (Comedy Channel 2008–2009)
 Merrick and Rosso Unplanned (Nine Network 2003–2004)
 The Micallef Program (ABC 1998–2001)
 Micallef Tonight (Nine Network 2003)
 The Mick Molloy Show (Nine Network 1999)
 Micro Nation (Eleven 2012)
 Mikey, Pubs and Beer Nuts (Network Ten 2000)
 The Money or the Gun (ABC 1992)
 Monster House (Nine Network 2008)
 A Moody Christmas (ABC 2012)
 The Moodys (ABC 2014)
 The Moth Effect (Amazon Prime 2021)
 Mr. Black (Network Ten 2019)
 Mrs. Finnegan (Seven Network 1969)
 Mulray (Seven Network 1994–1995)
 My Two Wives (Nine Network 1992)
 The Naked Vicar Show (Seven Network 1977–1978)
 The Nation (Nine Network 2007)
 Newlyweds (Seven Network 1993–1994)
 News Free Zone (ABC 1985)
 Newstopia (SBS 2007–2008)
 A Nice Day at the Office (ABC 1971–1972)
 Nice 'n Juicy (ABC 1966–1967)
 No Activity (Stan 2015–2018)
 No Thanks, I'm on a Diet (ABC 1976)
 The Norman Gunston Show (Seven Network 1975–1979)
 One Size Fits All (ABC 2000)
 Open Slather (Comedy Channel 2015)
 Orange Is the New Brown (Seven Network 2018)
 The Other Guy (Stan 2017–2020)
 Our Man in Canberra (ABC 1971–1972)
 Our Man in the Company (ABC 1973–1974)
 Outland (ABC 2012)
 Pacific Heat (Comedy Channel/Eleven 2016)
 Pat's Late Night Coffee Revival (Channel 31 2004)
 The Paul Hogan Show (Nine Network 1973–1984)
 Pizza (SBS 2000–2007)
 Please Like Me (ABC2 2013–2016)
 Plonk (Eleven 2014, Stan/Nine 2015)
 Preppers (ABC 2021)
 The Private World of Miss Prim (1966)
 Problems (ABC 2012)
 Ratbags (Network Ten 1981)
 Real Stories (Network Ten 2006)
 Regular Old Bogan (7mate 2020)
 Retrograde (ABC 2020)
 Review with Myles Barlow (ABC 2008–2011)
 The Rise and Fall of Wellington Boots (ABC 1975)
 Rita and Wally (Seven Network 1968)
 The Roast (ABC2 2012–2014)
 The Ronnie Johns Half Hour (Network Ten 2006)
 Ronny Chieng: International Student (ABC 2016–2017)
 Rosehaven (ABC 2016–2021)
 Rostered On (Netflix 2018, 7 mate 2019)
 Rubbery Figures (ABC 1987–1990)
 The Rumpus Room with Darren & Brose (Channel 31 1999–2002)
 Russell Coight's All Aussie Adventures (Network Ten 2002–2004, 2018)
 The Russell Gilbert Show (Nine Network 1998, 2000–2001)
 Sammy J & Randy in Ricketts Lane (ABC 2015)
 Sando (ABC 2018)
 Scattergood: Friend of All (ABC 1975)
 Shock, Horror, Aunty! (ABC 2012–2013)
 Shock Jock (Foxtel/ABC 2001–2002)
 Sit Down, Shut Up (Network Ten 2000)
 SkitHOUSE (Network Ten 2003)
 Sleuth 101 (ABC 2010)
 The Slot (The Comedy Channel 2017)
 Small Time Gangster (Movie Extra 2011)
 Snake Gully with Dad and Dave (Seven Network 1972)
 Soul Mates (ABC 2014–2016)
 Speaking in Tongues (SBS 2005–2006)
 Squinters (ABC 2018–2019)
 The Strange Calls (ABC2 2012)
 Street Smart (Network Ten 2018)
 Stupid, Stupid Man (TV1/ABC 2006–2007)
 Summer Heights High (ABC 2007)
 Supernova (BBC/UKTV 2005)
 Superwog (ABC Comedy 2018–)
 Surprise Surprise (Nine Network 2000–2001)
 Surprise Surprise Gotcha (Nine Network 2007)
 Swift and Shift Couriers (SBS 2008–2011)
 Taboo (Network Ten 2019)
 Take That (HSV-7 1957–1959)
 Talkin' 'Bout Your Generation (Network Ten 2009–12, Nine Network 2018–2019)
 Thank God You're Here (Network Ten 2006–2007, Seven Network 2009)
 This is Littleton (ABC2 2014)
 This Week Live (Network Ten 2013)
 Three Men of the City (ABC 1974)
 The Thursday Creek Mob (ABC 1971)
 Timothy (ABC 2014)
 Tomorrow Tonight (ABC 2018)
 Tonightly with Tom Ballard (ABC Comedy 2017–2018)
 The True Blue Show (Seven Network 1973–1974)
 True Story with Hamish & Andy (Nine Network 2017–2018)
 TV Burp (Seven Network 2009)
 TwentyfourSeven (SBS 2002)
 Twentysomething (ABC 2011, 2013)
 The Unbelievable Truth (Seven Network 2012)
 Under the Milky Way (Channel 31 2016)
 Unreal Ads (Network Ten 2000)
 Unreal TV (Network Ten 1999)
 Upper Middle Bogan (ABC 2013–2017) 
 The Urban Monkey with Murray Foote (ABC/ABC2 2009)
 Us and Them (Nine Network 1995)
 Very Small Business (ABC 2008)
 The Warehouse Comedy Festival (ABC 2012)
 The Warriors (ABC 2017–) 
 We Can Be Heroes: Finding The Australian of the Year (ABC 2005)
 The Wedge (Network Ten 2006–2007)
 Wedlocked (Seven Network 1994)
 Wednesday Night Fever (ABC 2013)
 Welcher & Welcher (ABC 2003)
 Wham Bam Thank You Ma'am (ABC2 2016)
 Whatever Happened to That Guy? (Comedy Channel 2009)
 Who Do You Think You Are? (ABC 1976)
 Whose Line is it Anyway? (Comedy Channel 2016)
 Wilfred (SBS 2007–2009)
 Willing and Abel (Nine Network 1987)
 The Wizards of Aus (SBS2 2016)
 Woodley (ABC 2012)

Documentaries

 50 Years of ABC TV (ABC 2016)
 The ABC of Our Lives – 50 Years of Television (ABC 2006)
 The Amazing 80s (Nine Network 2013)
 The Amazing 90s (Nine Network 2015)
 The Amazing Noughties (Nine Network 2016)
 Australian Druglords (Nine Network 2010)
 Australian Families of Crime (Nine Network 2010)
 Australian Wildlife (ABC 1963)
 Australia's Best Competition Competition (ABC 2022)
 Blue Water Empire (ABC 2019)
 Books that Made Us (ABC 2021)
 Bush Tucker Man (ABC 1987–1990)
 Carbon: The Unauthorised Biography (ABC 2022)
 Celebrating 50 Years: Reporting the Nation (ABC 2006)
 Celebrating 50 Years: Reporting the World (ABC 2006)
 Crime Investigation Australia (CI/Nine Network 2005–2010)
 The Daters (ABC 2014)
 Decadence (SBS)
 The Family Court Murders (2022)
 Forensic Investigators (Seven Network 2004–2006)
 Gangs of Oz (Seven Network 2009–2010)
 The Gift (Nine Network 2007–2009)
 Global Village (SBS 1998–2015)
 Hawke: The Larrikin & The Leader (2018)
 Help (SBS 2006)
 Hipsters (SBS 2015)
 Home Truths (ABC 1995)
 Howard on Menzies: The Making of Modern Australia (ABC 2016)
 Housemates (ABC 2016–2017)
 The Howard Years (ABC 2016)
 The Hunter (ABC News 24 2012)
 Inside Australia (SBS 2003–2009)
 Ithaka: A Fight to Free Julian Assange (2022)
 The Killing Season (ABC 2015)
 Labor in Power (ABC 2016)
 Look Me In The Eye (SBS 2017)
 Million Dollar Cold Case (Seven Network 2017)
 Miriam Margolyes: Almost Australian (ABC 2020)
 Mariam Margolyes: Australia Unmasked (ABC 2022)
 Missing Persons Unit (Nine Network 2006–2010)
 Murder Calls Australia (Nine Network 2017)
 Murder Uncovered (Seven Network 2017)
 My Space is an Amazing Place (SBS)
 New Look at New Guinea (ABC 1959–1960)
 Opening Shot (ABC2 2012–2015)
 Outback House (ABC 2005)
 Palazzo di Cozzo: The Australian Dream. Italian Style. (2022)
 Parent Rescue (SBS 2007)
 Pauline Hanson: Please Explain! (SBS 2016)
 Podlove (SBS 2007)
 Redesign My Brain (ABC 2013–2015)
 A River Somewhere (ABC 1975)
 Saltwater Heroes (Discovery Channel 2015)
 Secrets of Our Cities (SBS 2017–2020)
 Shaun Micallef's On The Sauce (ABC 2020)
 Shaun Micallef's Stairway to Heaven (SBS 2015–2016)
 Sporting Nation (ABC 2012)
 Storyline Australia (SBS 2004–2007)
 Struggle Street (SBS 2015)
 Sydney Grows Up (ABC 1958)
 Sydney Harbour Patrol (Discovery Channel 2016) 
 This Is Brazil! (SBS ONE 2014)
 Time of My Life (7TWO 2013)
 Tony Robinson's Time Walks (The History Channel 2013–2014, ABC 2016)
 Tough Nuts: Australia's Hardest Criminals (Crime & Investigation Network 2010–2012)
 Two of Us (SBS 2006)
 Who Makes The News? (ABC News 24 2012, ABC 2013)
 Wide Open Road (ABC 2011)
 The World Around Us (Seven Network 1979–2006)
 World Tales (SBS)

Drama

 600 Bottles of Wine (Network Ten 2018)
 800 Words (Seven Network 2015–2018) 
 Above the Law (Network Ten 2000)
 After the Deluge (Network Ten 2003)
 After the Verdict (Nine Network 2022) 
 Against the Wind (Seven Network 1978) (mini-series)
 The Alice (Nine Network 2005)
 All the Rivers Run (Seven Network 1983) (mini-series)
 All the Rivers Run 2 (Seven Network 1990) (mini-series)
 All Saints (Seven Network 1998–2009)
 All the Way (Nine Network 1988)
 Always Greener (Seven Network 2001–2004)
 Answered By Fire (ABC 2006)
 ANZAC Girls (ABC 2014)
 Anzacs (Nine Network 1985) (mini-series)
 Australian Gangster (Seven Network 2021)
 Australians (ABC 1996) (also known as Michael Willesee's Australians)
 Back to the Rafters (Amazon Prime 2021)
 Bad Mothers (Nine Network 2019)
 Bali 2002 (Stan drama 2022)
 Banished (BBC First 2015)
 Barons (ABC 2022)
 Barracuda (ABC 2016)
 Barrier Reef (ABC 1971–1972)
 Bastard Boys (ABC 2007) (mini-series)
 The Battlers (Seven Network 1968)
 Beat of the City (ABC 1975)
 The Beautiful Lie (ABC 2015)
 Bed of Roses (ABC 2008–2011)
 Bellamy (Network Ten 1981)
 Ben Hall (ABC 1975)
 Better Man (SBS1 2013) 
 Between Two Worlds (Seven Network 2020)
 Big Sky (Network Ten 1997–1999)
 Bikie Wars: Brothers in Arms (Network Ten 2012)
 Bite Club (Nine Network 2018)
 BlackJack (Network Ten 2003–2007)
 Bloom (Stan 2019–2021)
 Blue Heelers (Seven Network 1994–2006)
 Blue Murder (ABC 1995) (mini-series)
 Blue Murder: Killer Cop (Seven Network 2017) (mini-series)
 Bluey (Seven Network 1976–1977)
 Bodyline (Network Ten 1984) (mini-series)
 Boney (Seven Network 1972)
 Bordertown (ABC 1995)
 Brides of Christ (ABC 1991) (mini-series)
 Brock (Network Ten 2016)
 The Broken Shore (telemovie ABC 2014)
 Canal Road (Nine Network 2008)
 Captain James Cook (Australian/German co-production) (Network Ten 1987) (mini-series)
 Carla Cametti PD (SBS 2009)
 Case for the Defence (Network Ten 1978)
 Cash and Company (Seven Network 1975)
 Castaways (ABC 1973)
 Catching Milat (Seven Network 2015)
 Catwalk (ABC 1972)
 Chances (Nine Network 1991–1992)
 Changi (ABC 2001) (mini-series)
 Children's Hospital (ABC 1997–1998)
 Chopper Squad (Network Ten 1976–1979)
 The Circuit (SBS 2007–2009)
 City Homicide (Seven Network 2007–2011)
 Cleverman (ABC 2016–2017)
 Cloudstreet (Showcase 2011) (mini-series)
 Cluedo (Nine Network 1992)
 The Code (ABC 2014–2016)
 Colour in the Creek (Nine Network 1985)
 The Commons (Stan 2019)
 Consider Your Verdict (Seven Network 1961)
 Conspiracy 365 (Showcase 2012)
 Contrabandits (ABC 1967–1968)
 The Cooks (Network Ten 2004)
 Cop Shop (Seven Network 1977–1984)
 Cops L.A.C. (Nine Network 2010)
 A Country Practice (Seven Network 1981–1993, Network Ten 1994)
 CrashBurn (Network Ten 2003)
 Crownies (ABC 2011)
 The Cry (ABC 2019)
 The Cut (ABC 2009)
 The Damnation of Harvey McHugh (ABC 1994)
 Dangerous (FOX8 2007)
 Darby and Joan (Acorn 2022)
 The Day of the Roses (Network Ten 1998) (mini-series)
 Dead Lucky (SBS 2018)
 Dead Men Running (ABC 1971)
 Deadline Gallipoli (Showtime 2015) (mini-series)
 Deep Water (SBS 2016)
 Delta (ABC 1969–1970)
 Devil's Playground (Showcase 2014)
 Diary of an Uber Driver (ABC 2019)
 A Difficult Woman (ABC 1998) (mini-series)
 Dirt Game (ABC 2009)
 The Dirtwater Dynasty (Network Ten 1988) (mini-series)
 The Dismissal (Network Ten 1983) (mini-series)
 Division 4 (Nine Network 1969–1975)
 Divorce Court (Nine Network 1967)
 The Doctor Blake Mysteries (ABC 2013–2017)
 Doctor Doctor (Nine Network 2016–2021)
 Dogwoman (Nine Network 2000)
 Dynasty (ABC 1970–1971)
 East of Everything (ABC 2008–2009)
 East West 101 (SBS 2007–2011)
 Eden (Stan 2021)
 Embassy (ABC 1990–1992)
 Emergency (Nine Network and Seven Network 1959)
 The Emigrants (ABC 1977)
 The End (Binge 2021)
 Fallen Angels (ABC 1997)
 The Far Country (ABC 1972)
 The Far Country (ABC 1987)
 Fat Tony & Co. (Nine Network 2014)
 The Feds (Nine Network 1993–1996)
 Fighting Season (Showcase 2018)
 Fire (Seven Network 1995–1996)
 Firebite (AMC 2021
 Fireflies (ABC 2004)
 Fires (ABC 2021)
 The Flying Doctors (Nine Network 1987–1991)
 For the Term of His Natural Life (Nine Network 1983) (mini-series)
 The Fourth Wish (ABC 1974)
 Friday On My Mind (ABC 2017) (mini-series)
 G.P. (ABC 1989–1996)
 Gallipoli (Nine Network 2015)
 The Girl from Steel City (SBS 1986)
 Glitch (ABC 2015–2019)
 The Godfathers (Nine Network 1971–1972)
 The Gods of Wheat Street (ABC 2014)
 Going Home (SBS 2000–2001)
 Golden Pennies (ABC 1985)
 Good Guys Bad Guys (Nine Network 1997–1998)
 Halifax f.p. (Nine Network 1994–2001, 2020–)
 The Harp in the South (Network Ten 1987)
 Harrow (ABC 2018–2021)
 The Haunted School (ABC 1986) 
 Head Start (ABC 2001)
 headLand (Seven Network 2005–2006)
 Heartland (ABC 1994) (mini-series)
 Here Out West (ABC 2022)
 Hiding (ABC 2015)
 Hoges (Seven Network 2017)
 Homicide (Seven Network 1964–1976)
 House Gang (ABC 1996)
 House Husbands (Nine Network 2012–2017)
 House of Hancock (Nine Network 2015)
 The House on the Corner (ATN-7 1957)
 House Rules (SBS 1988)
 Howzat! Kerry Packer's War (Nine Network 2012) (mini-series)
 Hungry Ghosts (SBS 2020)
 The Hungry Ones (ABC 1963)
 Hunter (ABC 1967–1969) 
 The Hunting (SBS 2019)
 Hyde and Seek (Nine Network 2016)
 The Incredible Journey of Mary Bryant (Network Ten 2005) (mini-series)
 Informer 3838 (Nine Network 2020)
 Inside Running (ABC 1981)
 INXS: Never Tear Us Apart (Seven Network 2014)
 Jack Irish (ABC 2012–2021)
 Janet King (ABC 2014–2017)
 Janus (ABC 1994–1995)
 Jessica (Network Ten 2004)
 Jonah (Seven Network 1962)
 Kangaroo Palace (Seven Network 1997)
 The Kettering Incident (Showcase 2016)
 The Killing Field (Seven Network 2014)
 Killing Time (TV1 2011)
 King's Men (Seven Network 1976)
 Kirby's Company (ABC 1977)
 Lambs of God (Fox Showcase 2019)
 Last Man Standing (Seven Network 2005)
 The Last Resort (ABC 1988–1989)
 Law of the Land (Nine Network 1993)
 Les Norton (ABC 2019)
 Lie With Me (Network Ten 2021) 
 The Link Men (Nine Network 1970)
 Little Oberon (Nine Network 2005) (telemovie)
 The Long Arm (Network Ten 1970)
 Love Bytes (Fox8 2004)
 Love Child (Nine Network 2014–2017)
 Love Is a Four Letter Word (ABC 2001)
 Love My Way (FOX8 2004, W 2005, Showcase 2006)
 Lucky Colour Blue (ABC 1976)
 Luke's Kingdom (Nine Network 1976)
 The Man From Snowy River (Nine Network 1993–1996) (also known in the United States as "Snowy River: The McGregor Saga")
 Marion (ABC 1974)
 Marking Time (ABC 2003) (mini-series)
 Marshall Law (Seven Network 2002)
 Matlock Police (Network Ten 1971–1975)
 McLeod's Daughters (Nine Network 2001–2009)
 MDA (ABC 2002–2005)
 Medivac (Network Ten 1996–1998)
 Menotti (ABC 1980–1981)
 Mercury (ABC 1996)
 Miss Fisher's Murder Mysteries (ABC 2012–2015)
 Molly (Seven Network 2016)
 More Winners (ABC 1990)
 Mr & Mrs Murder (Network Ten 2013)
 Mr Inbetween (Fox Showcase 2018–2021)
 Mrs Biggs (ITV/Seven Network 2012)
 Murder Call (Nine Network 1997–1999)
 The Murray Whelan Series (ABC 2004)
 My Brother Jack (ABC 1965)
 My Brother Jack (ABC 2001)
 Mystery Road (ABC 2018–2020)
 Naked: Stories of Men (ABC 1996)
 New Gold Mountain (SBS 2021)
 Newton's Law (ABC 2017)
 Offspring (Network Ten 2010–2014, 2016–2017)
 Old School (ABC 2014)
 Olivia Newton-John: Hopelessly Devoted to You (Seven Network 2018)
 On the Ropes (SBS 2018) 
 Operation Buffalo (ABC 2020)
 The Outcasts (ABC 1960) 
 The Outsiders (ABC 1976–1977)
 Over the Hill (Seven Network 1994–1995)
 Over There (ABC 1972–1973)
 Packed to the Rafters (Seven Network 2008–2013)
 Paper Giants: Magazine Wars (ABC 2013)
 Pastures of the Blue Crane (ABC 1969)
 Party Tricks (Network Ten 2014)
 The Patriots (ABC 1962)
 Patrol Boat (ABC 1979–1980)
 The People Next Door (Nine Network 1973)
 Peter Allen: Not The Boy Next Door (Seven Network 2015) (mini-series)
 Phoenix (ABC 1992–1993)
 Picnic at Hanging Rock (Showcase 2018)
 Pig in a Poke (ABC 1977)
 Pine Gap (2018)
 A Place To Call Home (Seven Network 2013–14, SoHo 2015, Showcase 2016–2018)
 Playing for Keeps (Network Ten 2018–2019)
 Police Rescue (ABC 1991–1996)
 Poor Man's Orange (Network Ten 1989) (mini-series)
 The Potato Factory (Seven Network 2000) (mini-series)
 Power Games: The Packer-Murdoch War (Nine Network 2013) (mini-series)
 Power Without Glory (ABC 1976)
 The Principal (SBS 2015) (mini-series)
 Puberty Blues (Network Ten 2012–2014)
 Pulse (ABC 2017)
 The Purple Jacaranda (ABC 1964)
 Rafferty's Rules (Seven Network 1987–1990)
 Rake (ABC 2010–2018)
 Rain Shadow (ABC 2007)
 RAN (Remote Area Nurse) (SBS 2006)
 Redfern Now (ABC 2012–2015)
 Reef Doctors (Network Ten, Eleven 2013)
 Rescue: Special Ops (Nine Network 2009–2011)
 Restoration (9Go! 2016)
 R.F.D.S. (Nine Network 1992–1993)
 RFDS (Seven Network 2021)
 Ride on Stranger (ABC 1979) (mini-series)
 Riptide (Seven Network 1969)
 Robbery Under Arms (ABC 1985)
 Romper Stomper (Stan 2018)
 Rush (ABC 1974–1976)
 Rush (Network Ten 2008–2011)
 Ryan (Seven Network 1973–1974) 
 Safe Harbour (SBS 2018)
 Satisfaction (Showcase 2007–2010)
 Scales of Justice (ABC 1983) 
 Schapelle (Nine Network 2014)
 Scorched (Nine Network 2008)
 Sea Patrol (Nine Network 2007–2011)
 SeaChange (ABC 1998–2000, Nine Network 2019)
 Secret Bridesmaids' Business (Seven Network 2019)
 Secret City (Showcase 2016–2019)
 The Secret Daughter (Seven Network 2016–2017)
 The Secret Life of Us (Network Ten 2001–2005)
 The Secret River (ABC 2015) (mini-series)
 Secrets (ABC 1993) 
 Secrets & Lies (Network Ten 2014)
 See How They Run (ABC/BBC 1999)
 Serpent in the Rainbow (ABC 1973)
 Seven Types of Ambiguity (ABC 2017)
 Serangoon Road (ABC 2013)
 Shannon's Mob (Nine Network 1975–1976) 
 The Shark Net (ABC 2003)
 Shark's Paradise (Network Ten 1986)
 Shell Presents (1959–1960)
 The Silence (ABC 2006) (mini-series)
 Silent Number (Nine Network 1974–1976)
 Sisters (Network Ten 2017)
 Skirts (Seven Network 1990)
 The Slap (ABC 2011)
 Slide (FOX8 2011)
 Small Claims (Network Ten 2005–2006)
 Snowy (Nine Network 1993) 
 Solo One (Seven Network 1976)
 Special Squad (Network Ten 1984)
 Spirited (W 2010–2011)
 The Spoiler (Nine Network 1972)
 Spyforce (ABC 1971–1973)
 Stacey's Gym (ABC 1974)
 Stark (ABC/BBC 1993)
 Starting From … Now! (SBS2 2015–2016)
 State Coroner (Network Ten 1997–1998)
 Stateless (ABC 2020) 
 Stingers (Nine Network 1998–2004)
 Stormy Petrel (ABC 1960)
 The Story of Peter Grey (Seven Network 1961)
 The Straits (ABC 2012)
 The Strip (Nine Network 2008)
 Sun on the Stubble (ABC 1996) (also known as The Valley Between)
 Sunshine (SBS 2017)
 The Surgeon (Network Ten 2005)
 Sweet and Sour (ABC 1984)
 Sword of Honour (Seven Network 1986)
 The Tailings (SBS 2021)
 Tales of the South Seas (Network Ten 1998)
 Tanamera – Lion of Singapore (Network Ten 1989)
 Tandarra (Seven Network 1976)
 Tangle (Showcase 2009–2012)
 A Taste for Blue Ribbons (ABC 1973)
 Tenko (ABC/BBC 1981–1984)
 The Thorn Birds (Nine Network 1983) (American production) (mini-series)
 A Thousand Skies (Seven Network 1985) (mini-series)
 Three Forever (SBS 1998)
 Tidelands (Netflix 2018)
 The Time Of Our Lives (ABC 2013–2014)
 Timelapse (ABC 1980)
 The Timeless Land (ABC 1980) (mini-series)
 Top of the Lake (UKTV 2013, BBC First 2017, ABC 2015–2020)
 A Touch of Reverence (ABC 1974)
 The Tourist (Stan 2022)
 A Town Like Alice (Seven Network 1981)
 Tricky Business (Nine Network 2012)
 Tripping Over (Network Ten 2006))
 Troppo (ABC 2022) 
 The Truckies (ABC 1978)
 The Twelve (2022)
 True Colours (SBS 2022)
 Twisted Tales (Nine Network 1996)
 Two Twisted (Nine Network 2006)
 Underbelly (Nine Network 2008)
 Underbelly: Badness (Nine Network 2012)
 Underbelly Files: Chopper (Nine Network 2018)
 Underbelly: The Golden Mile (Nine Network 2010)
 Underbelly: Razor (Nine Network 2011)
 Underbelly: Squizzy (Nine Network 2013)
 Underbelly: A Tale of Two Cities (Nine Network 2009)
 Underbelly: Vanishing Act (Nine Network 2022) 
 The Unloved (Nine Network 1968)
 Upright (Foxtel Showcase 2019)
 The Unusual Suspects (SBS 2021)
 The Violent Earth (Network Ten 1998)
 Wake In Fright (Network Ten 2017) 
 Wakefield (ABC 2021)
 Wanted (Seven Network 2016–2017)
 Water Rats (Nine Network 1996–2001)
 Wentworth (SoHo 2013–2015, Fox Showcase 2017–2021, ABC 2018–2021)
 Whiplash (Seven Network 1961)
 White Collar Blue (Network Ten 2002–2003)
 Wild Boys (Seven Network 2011)
 Wildside (ABC 1997–1999)
 Winners (ABC 1985)
 Winners and Losers (Seven Network 2011–2016)
 Winter (Seven Network 2015)
 Wolf Creek (Stan/Nine Network 2016–2018)
 Women of the Sun (ABC 1981) (mini-series)
 Wonderland (Network Ten 2013–2015)
 The Wrong Girl (Network Ten 2016–2017)
 Young Lions (Nine Network 2002)
 Young Ramsay (Seven Network 1977–1979)

Factual

 72 Dangerous Animals: Asia (Netflix 2018)
 72 Dangerous Animals: Latin America (Netflix 2017)
 8 Nights Out West (ABC 2022)
 Advancing Australia (Network Ten 2021)
 AFP (Nine Network 2011)
 Air Ways (Seven Network 2009–2012)
 Animal Emergency (Nine Network 2007–2009)
 Any Questions (ABC 1958–1960)
 Beach Cops (Seven Network 2015–2016)
 Beyond 2000 (Seven Network 1985–1993, Network Ten 1993–1995, 1999)
 Beyond Tomorrow (Seven Network 2005–2006)
 BIG - Extreme Makeover (Nine Network 2011)
 Blokesworld (Channel 31, Aurora, 7mate, One 2003–2016)
 Bondi Ink (Eleven 2015–2017)
 Bondi Vet (Network Ten 2009–2016)
 Books and Authors (ATN-7 1956–1957)
 Bush Doctors (Seven Network 2008)
 Changing Faces (Style 2015)
 The Checkout (ABC 2013–2018)
 Class Of... (Network Ten 2012)
 Coastwatch Oz (Seven Network 2014)
 The Code (Nine Network 2007)
 Come In on This (ABC 1959)
 Court Justice: Sydney (Foxtel Crime + Investigation Network 2017) (Style 2015)
 Crash Investigation Unit (Seven Network 2008)
 Demonstrations in Physics (ABC 1969)
 Dumb, Drunk and Racist (ABC 2012)
 Dynasties (ABC 2011)
 The Embassy (Nine Network 2014–2016)
 Emergency Call (Seven Network 2018–2019)
 Employable Me (ABC 2018)
 Face the Nation (GTV-9 1958–1959)
 Family Confidential (ABC 2012–2015)
 Family Footsteps (ABC 2006–)
 Fashion Bloggers (Style 2014–2015)
 Find My Family (Seven Network 2008–2010)
 Fire 000 (Nine Network 2008)
 First Contact (SBS 2014–2016)
 Go Back to Where You Came From (SBS 2011–2012, 2015)
 Gold Coast Cops (Network Ten 2014–2015)
 Gold Coast Medical (Seven Network 2016–2017)
 Going Places (Nine Network 2007)
 Great Expectations (ABC 2013)
 Hatch, Match & Dispatch (ABC 2016)
 Head First (ABC2 2013, ABC 2014)
 Health (ABC 1959)
 Inside Central Station (SBS 2021)
 Islands of Oz (Seven Network 2016)
 Instant People (Seven Network 1962–1963)
 Julia Zemiro's Home Delivery (ABC 2013)
 Kalgoorlie Cops (Crime & Investigation Network 2011)
 Kings Cross ER: St Vincent's Hospital (Foxtel Crime + Investigation Network 2012–2015)
 Last Chance Surgery (Seven Network 2009)
 Life on the Outside (SBS 2022–)
 Long Lost Family (Network Ten 2016)
 Medical Emergency (Seven Network 2005–2010)
 Meet the Penguins (ABC 2022)
 MegaTruckers (A&E Australia 2013–2015)
 Melbourne Composers (ABC 1961–196?)
 Melbourne Magazine (ABV-2 1957)
 Missing Pieces (Nine Network 2009)
 Money (Nine Network 1993–2002, 2002–2006)
 Nature Notebook (ABV-2 1958)
 Nurses (Seven Network 2021)
 Old People's Home for 4 Year Olds (ABC 2019)
 One Born Every Minute Australia (Network Ten 2019)
 Outback Adventures (ABC 1997)
 Outback ER (ABC 2015)
 Outback Wildlife Rescue (Seven Network 2008–2010)
 Pawn Stars Australia (A&E 2015)
 Photo Finish (ABC 2012)
 Picture Page (ABC 1957)
 Police Files: Unlocked (Seven Network 2006–2007)
 The Real Seachange (Seven Network 2006–2007)
 Recruits (Network Ten 2009–2010)
 Recruits: Paramedics (Network Ten 2011)
 Road Safety (GTV-9 1957)
 Royal Flying Doctor Service (Nine Network 2007)
 RPA (Nine Network 1995–2012)
 RSPCA Animal Rescue (Seven Network 2007–2010)
 Saving Babies (Network Ten 2007)
 Saving Kids (Network Ten 2008)
 Science Today (ABC 1958)
 Search and Rescue (Nine Network 2008)
 The Secret Life of 4 Year Olds (Network Ten 2018)
 Shitsville Express (ABC 2013)
 Stargazing Live (ABC 2017–2018)
 Southern Ocean Live (ABC 2022)
 Steve Irwin's Wildlife Warriors (Network Ten 2012)
 Streets of Your Town (ABC 2016)
 Sudden Impact (Nine Network 2008)
 Surf Patrol (Seven Network 2007–2010)
 Surveillance Oz (Seven Network 2012–2016)
 Thalu (NITV/ABC ME 2020)
 This Is Your Life (Seven Network 1975–1980, Nine Network 1995–2005, 2011)
 Tomorrow's World (ABC 1959)
 Tonic (ABC 2011–2012)
 Towards 2000 (ABC 1981–1984)
 Triple Zero Heroes (Seven Network 2009)
 Unreal Estate (Nine Network 2016)
 Untold Stories (ABC 2014)
 What Really Happens in Bali (Seven Network 2014)
 What Really Happens in Thailand (Seven Network 2015)
 What Really Happens on the Gold Coast (Seven Network 2016)
 Who's Been Sleeping in My House? (ABC 2011–2013)
 Why Is It So? (ABC 1963–1986)
 The World's Strictest Parents (Seven Network 2009–2012)
 You Saved My Life (Nine Network 2009)
 Young Doctors (Nine Network/9Gem 2011–2012)
 The Zoo (Seven Network 2008–2010)
 Zumbo (SBS 2011)

Game shows

 1 vs. 100 (Nine Network 2007–2008)
 ADbc (SBS 2009–2010)
 All About Faces (Nine Network 1971)
 All Star Family Feud (Network Ten 2016–2018)
 All-Star Squares (Seven Network 1999)
 Almost Anything Goes (Network Ten 1976–1978)
 A*mazing (Seven Network 1994–1998)
 Ampol Stamp Quiz (Nine Network 1964–1965)
 Any Questions? (ABC 1950s)
 Are You Smarter than a 5th Grader? (Network Ten 2007–2009)
 Australia's Brainiest (Seven Network 2004, Network Ten 2005–2006)
 Balance Your Budget (TCN-9 1959–1960)
 Battle of the Sexes (Network Ten 1998)
 Beat the Odds (Seven Network 1971–1972)
 Behave Yourself! (Seven Network 2017)
 Bert's Family Feud (Nine Network 2006–2007)
 The Better Sex (Nine Network 1978)
 The Big Game (GTV-9 1966)
 The Big Music Quiz (Seven Network 2016)
 Big Nine (Nine Network 1969–1970)
 Big Square Eye (ABC 1991–1993)
 Binnie Time (GTV-9 1958–1959)
 Blankety Blanks (Network Ten 1977–1978, Nine Network 1985–1986, 1996)
 Blind Date (Network Ten 1967–1970, Seven Network 1974, Network Ten 1991, 2018)
 Blockbusters (Seven Network 1990–1994)
 Burgo's Catch Phrase (Nine Network 1997–2004)
 Buy Word (HSV-7 1962)
 Cannonball (Seven Network 2017)
 Cash Bonanza (Nine Network 2001)
 Cash Cab (Channel V 2007–2010)
 Casino 10 (Network Ten 1975–1977)
 Catch Us If You Can (Seven Network 1981)
 The Celebrity Game (Nine Network 1969, Network Ten 1976–1977)
 Celebrity Name Game (Network Ten 2019–2020)
 Celebrity Squares (Network Ten 1967, Nine Network 1975–1976)
 Celebrity Tattletales (Seven Network 1980)
 Clever (Nine Network 2006)
 Coles £3000 Question, Coles $6000 Question and The $7000 Question (Seven Network 1960–1971)
 The Con Test (Network Ten 2007)
 Concentration (Nine Network 1950s–1967, Seven Network 1970s, 1997)
 CRAM! (Network Ten 2017)
 Crossfire (Nine Network 1987–1988)
 The Cube Australia (Network Ten 2021)
 The Daryl and Ossie Show (Network Ten 1978)
 Deal or No Deal (Seven Melbourne 2003–2013)
 Dirty Laundry Live (ABC 2013–2015)
 Do You Trust Your Wife? (GTV-9 1957–1958)
 Dog Eat Dog (Seven Network 2002–2003)
 Don't Forget Your Toothbrush (Nine Network 1995)
 Double Dare (Network Ten 1989–1992)
 Double Your Dollars (Nine Network 1965)
 Download (Nine Network 2000–2002)
 The Dulux Show (Seven Network 1957)
 EC Plays Lift Off (ABC 1994)
 The Einstein Factor (ABC 2004–2009)
 Fairway Fun (Nine Network 1960s)
 Family Bowl Quiz (ABC 1969)
 Family Double Dare (Network Ten 1989)
 Family Feud (Nine Network 1977–1984, Seven Network 1988–1996, Network Ten 2014–2018, 2020)
 The Family Game (Network Ten 1967)
 Find the Link (ABC 1957–1958?)
 Flashback (ABC 1983, 2000)
 Flashez (ABC 1976–1977)
 Ford Superquiz (Nine Network 1981–1982)
 Free for All (Nine Network 1973)
 Friday Night Games (Network Ten 2006)
 Fun with Charades (HSV-7 1956–1958)
 Gambit (Nine Network 1974)
 Game of Games (Network Ten 2018)
 The Generation Game
 The Generation Gap (Network Ten 1969)
 Get the Message (Network Ten 1971–1972)
 Give it a Go (Seven Network 1957)
 Gladiators (Seven Network 1995–1997, 2008)
 Go Go Stop (Seven Network 2004–2009)
 The Golden Show (Nine Network 1960s)
 The Gong Show (Network Ten 1976)
 The Great Australian Spelling Bee (Network Ten 2015–2016)
 Great Temptation (Seven Network 1970–1976)
 The Great TV Game Show (Network Ten 1989)
 Greed (Network Ten 2001)
 Guess What? (Nine Network 1992–1993)
 Happy Go Lucky (TCN-9/HSV-7 1961)
 Have a Go (Seven Network 1987)
 Head 2 Head (ABC TV 2006)
 High Rollers (Seven Network 1975)
 Hole in the Wall (Nine Network 2008)
 Hot Streak (Seven Network 1998)
 I Do I Do (Network Ten 1996)
 Initial Reaction (Nine Network 2000)
 It Could Be You (Nine Network 1960–1967, 1969, 1982)
 It Pays to Be Funny (Seven Network 1957–1958)
 It's a Knockout (Network Ten 1985–1987, 2011–2012)
 I've Got a Secret (Network Ten 1966, 1968–1969)
 Jackpot (TCN 1960–1961)
 Jeopardy! (Network Ten 1970–1978, 1993)
 Jigsaw (Nine Network 1960s)
 Joker Poker (Network Ten 2005–2006)
 Ken and Jonathan (Seven Network 1964)
 Keynotes (Nine Network 1964, 1992–1993)
 The Krypton Factor (ABC 1987)
 Lady for a Day
 A League of Their Own (Network Ten 2013)
 Let's Make a Deal (Nine Network 1968–1969, 1977, Network Ten 1991)
 Letter Charades (Nine Network 1967)
 Letterbox and $50,000 Letterbox (Seven Network 1962, 1981)
 Letters and Numbers (SBS 2010–2012)
 Little Aussie Battlers (Nine Network 1998)
 Long Play (Network Ten 1977)
 The Love Game (Seven Network 1984)
 The Lucky Show (TCN-9 1959–1961)
 The Main Event (Seven Network 1991–1992)
 Man O Man (Seven Network 1994)
 The Marriage Game (Network Ten 1966–1972)
 The Master (Seven Network 2006)
 Match Game (Network Ten 1960s)
 Match Mates (Nine Network 1981–1982)
 Micro Macro (ABC 1978)
 Midnight Zoo (Seven Network 2006)
 Million Dollar Chance Of A Lifetime (Seven Network 1999–2000)
 Million Dollar Minute (Seven Network 2013–2015)
 Million Dollar Wheel of Fortune (Nine Network 2008)
 Mind Twist (Network Ten 1992–1993)
 The Mint (Nine Network 2007–2008)
 Minute to Win It (Seven Network 2010)
 Money Makers (Network Ten 1971–1973, 1982)
 My Fair Lady (HSV-7 1958–1962)
 My Generation (Nine Network 1995–1996)
 Name That Tune (TCN9 1956–1957, 1975)
 National Bingo Night (Seven Network 2007)
 National Star Quest (Regional TV 1978)
 The Newlywed Game (Network Ten 1968, Nine Network 1987)
 Now You See It (Seven Network 1985–1996, Nine Network 1998–1999)
 Off to the Races (ATV-0 1967–1969)
 Opportunity Knocks (Seven Network Sydney 1977–1978)
 Out of the Question (Seven Network 2008)
 The Oz Game (ABC 1988–1989)
 Party Time (Seven Network 1963)
 Pass the Buck (Nine Network 2002)
 Perfect Match (Network Ten 1978, 1984–1989, Seven Network 2002)
 Personality Squares (Network Ten 1967–1969, 1981)
 Pick a Box (Seven Network 1957–1971)
 Pick Your Face (Nine Network 1999–2003)
 Play Your Cards Right (Seven Network 1984)
 Play Your Hunch (Nine Network 1962–1964)
 Playcards (Network Ten 1969)
 Pointless (Network Ten 2018–2019)
 Pot Luck (Network Ten 1987)
 Pot Of Gold (Network Ten 1975–1978)
 Power of 10 (Nine Network 2008)
 Press Your Luck (Seven Network 1987–1988)
 The Pressure Pak Show (Seven Network 1957–1958)
 The Price Is Right (ATN7 1957–1959, GTV9 1958, Seven Network 1963, Network Ten 1973–1974, Seven Network 1981–1986, Network Ten 1989, Nine Network 1993–1998, 2003–2005, Seven Network 2012–2013)
 Pyramid (Nine Network 2009–2012, 9Go! 2013–2014)
 Pyramid Challenge (Network Ten 1978)
 Quest (ABC 1976–1978)
 A Question of Sport (Network Ten 1995–1996)
 The Quiz Kids (Seven Network 1964–1968)
 Quiz Master (Seven Network 2002)
 Quizmania (Nine Network 2006–2007)
 Race Around the World (ABC)
 Raising a Husband (1957–195?)
 Randling (ABC 2012)
 The Rich List (Seven Network 2007–2008)
 Ripsnorters (Seven Network 1997)
 RocKwiz (SBS 2005–2017)
 Sale of the Century (Nine Network 1980–2001)
 Say G'day (Nine Network 1987)
 Say When!! (Nine Network 1962–1964)
 Search for a Star (Network Ten 1970–1971, 1981)
 Second Chance (Network Ten 1977)
 Shafted (Nine Network 2002)
 Show Me the Money (Nine Network)
 Show Me the Movie! (Network Ten 2018–2019)
 Showcase (Network Ten 1965–1970, 1973–1974, 1978)
 The Singing Bee (Nine Network 2007–2010)
 Sleek Geeks (ABC 2008–2010)
 SlideShow (Seven Network 2013)
 Snakes and Ladders (HSV-7 1959)
 Spending Spree (Nine Network 1971–1976)
 Spicks and Specks (ABC 2005–2011, 2014)
 Split Personality (Network Ten 1967)
 Split Second (Nine Network 1972–1973)
 Sport in Question (ABC TV 1986)
 The Squiz (SBS 2009–2010)
 Star Search (Network Ten 1985–1986, 1991)
 Stop the Music (Seven Network 1950s)
 Strictly Dancing (ABC 2004–2005)
 Strike It Lucky (Nine Network 1994)
 Supermarket Sweep (Nine Network 1991–1994)
 Superquiz (Network Ten 1989)
 Surprise Package (Nine Network 1961)
 Surprise! Surprise! (Network Ten 1972)
 Take a Chance (Seven Network 1959)
 Take the Hint (Nine Network 1962–1966)
 Take A Letter (Network Ten 1967)
 Take Me Out (Seven Network 2018)
 Taken Out (Network Ten 2008)
 Talkin' 'Bout Your Generation (Network Ten 2009–12, Nine Network 2018–2019)
 Talking Telephone Numbers (Seven Network 1996)
 Tell the Truth (Nine Network 1959–1965, Network Ten 1971–1972)
 Temptation (Nine Network 2005–2009)
 That's My Desire (HSV-7 1958–1960)
 Theatre Sports (ABC 1987)
 Think Tank (ABC 2018)
 Three on a Match (early 1970s)
 Tic-Tac-Dough (Nine Network 1960–1964)
 Time Masters (Seven Network 1996–1998)
 The Tommy Hanlon Show (Nine Network 1967–1968)
 Total Recall (Seven Network 1994–1995)
 Tractor Monkeys (ABC 2013)
 Treasure Hunt (Network Ten 1977–1978)
 The Trivial Video Show (Seven Network 1986)
 The Trophy Room (ABC 2010)
 TV Bingo (TCN-9 1965)
 TV Talent Scout (Seven Network 1957–1958)
 University Challenge (ABC 1987–1989)
 The Up-Late Game Show (Network Ten 2005–2006)
 Video Village (Seven Network 1962–1966)
 Vidiot (ABC 1992–1994)
 Visquiz (SBS 1985)
 The Weakest Link (Seven Network 2001–2002)
 Wedding Day (Seven Network 1956–1957)
 What Next (ABV-2 1958–1959)
 What's in the Picture (ABC 1958–1959)
 What's It Worth? (ABC 1950s)
 What's the Meaning? (HSV-7 1962)
 What's My Line (TCN-9 1956–1958)
 Wheel of Fortune (Nine Network 1959–1962, no relation to later series of the same name)
 Wheel of Fortune (Seven Network 1981–2006) (see also Million Dollar Wheel of Fortune)
 The White Room (Seven Network 2010)
 Who Dares Wins (Seven Network 1997–1998)
 Who Wants to Be a Millionaire? (Nine Network 1999–2007)
 Win Roy and HG's Money (Seven Network 2000)
 Wipeout (Seven Network 1999–2001) 
 Wipeout Australia (Nine Network 2009)
 Would You Believe? (ABC 1970–1974)
 You May Be Right (Seven Network 2006)
 You're Back in the Room (Nine Network 2016)
 You're A Star (Network Ten 1982)

Lifestyle

 About Your Garden (HSV-7 1959–1960)
 Aerobics Oz Style (Network Ten 1982–2005)
 Anh Does... (Seven Network 2012–2015)
 At Home (RTS-5A, SES-8)
 At Home with David Jones (CTC-7 1963–1964)
 Auction Room (ABC 2012)
 Auction Squad (Seven Network 2001–2004)
 The Aussie Property Flippers (Seven Network 2017)
 Australia's Best Backyards (Seven Network 2007)
 Australia's Best Houses (7Two 2013)
 Back in Time for Dinner (ABC 2018)
 Backyard Blitz (Nine Network 2000–2007)
 Beauty Case (TCN-9 1958)
 Beauty is My Business (HSV-7 1957–1958)
 Behind the Sash (Network Ten 2019)
 Bright Ideas (Network Ten 1997–2005)
 Burke's Backyard (Nine Network 1987–2004)
 Buying Blind (Nine Network 2018)
 Can We Help? (ABC 2006–2011)
 Canberra Gardener (ABC 1964–1966)
 Changing Rooms (Nine Network 1995–2005, Network Ten 2019)
 The Chef Presents (HSV-7 1957–1959)
 Collectors (ABC 2005–2011)
 The Cook and the Chef (ABC 2006–2010)
 Cordon Bleu Kitchen (ATN-7 1960)
 Costa's Garden Odyssey (SBS 2009–2011)
 Counterpoints (TCN-9 1958)
 Coxy's Big Break (Seven Network 2004–2015)
 The Critics (ABC 1959–1960)
 Cross Country (Prime7, GWN7, Seven Queensland, Southern Cross GTS/BKN, SES8, RTS5A, GWN7, Imparja Television, Southern Cross Tasmania, 1989–1999)
 Cruise Mode (Network Ten 2016–2017)
 Deadline Design with Shaynna Blaze (Lifestyle Home 2016–)
 Dirty Jobs (Nine Network 2007)
 Discover Downunder (Nine Network 2010–2014)
 Discover Tasmania (Southern Cross Tasmania 2007)
 DIY Rescue (Nine Network 2003)
 Do It (Nine Network 2006–2010)
 Domestic Blitz (Nine Network 2008–2010)
 Duncan's Thai Kitchen (9Gem 2014)
 Everyday Health (Network Ten 2016)
 Fashion Digest (ATN-7/GTV-9 1960–1961)
 Food 4 Life (Seven Network 2007, 4ME 2013–)
 Food Lovers' Guide to Australia (SBS 1996–2006)
 Food Safari (SBS 2006–2018)
 Fresh (Nine Network 2000–2009)
 Fun With Food (Nine Network 1960–1971)
 Gourmet Farmer (SBS 2010)
 The Great Australian Cookbook (Lifestyle Food 2017)
 The Great Day Out (Seven Network Queensland 2017–2020)
 The Great Outdoors (Seven Network 1992–2009, 2012)
 The Great South East (Seven Network Queensland 2001–2016)
 Green Fingers (HSV-7 1957–1959)
 Ground Force (Seven Network 1999–2004)
 Handyman (HSV-7 1957–1958)
 Harry's Practice (Seven Network 1997–2003)
 Home Cooked! With Julie Goodwin (Nine Network 2010)
 Hot Property (Seven Network 1999–2010, Nine Network 2010–2013)
 The Home Show (TCN-9 1956–1957)
 The House and Garden Show (TCN-9 1958)
 House Calls to the Rescue (Seven Network)
 Huey's Cooking Adventures (Seven Network 1997, Network Ten 1998–2010)
 Huey's Kitchen (Network Ten 2010–2014)
 Is Your House Killing You? (SBS 2007)
 It's a Lifestyle TV (Network Ten 2013)
 The Jean Bowring Show (HSV-7 1957–1960)
 Just Add Water WA (Nine Network 1996–2011)
 Keeping Company (GTV-9 1958–1959)
 Let's Dance (HSV-7 1957)
 Let's Do It (Network Ten)
 Let's Make Clothes (1959)
 Level 23 (Network Ten 1994)
 Level 3 (Channel 31 2005–2012)
 Location Location Location Australia (Lifestyle Channel 2012–2014)
 Lonely Planet Six Degrees (SBS)
 Lovely to Look At (GTV-9 1957)
 Luke Nguyen's Vietnam (SBS 2010–2011)
 Lyndey and Blair's Taste of Greece (SBS 2011)
 Mainly for Women (ABC 1961–1964)
 Mannequin Parade (GTV-9 1957–1958)
 Melbourne Weekender (Seven Network Melbourne 2006–2016)
 Menus for Moderns (ATN-7 1960–1961)
 Mercurio's Menu (Seven Network 2008–2011)
 A Moveable Feast (Seven Network 2015–2017)
 My Family Feast (SBS 2009–2010)
 My Home (Nine Network 2007)
 The N.R.M.A Show (TCN-9 1957)
 The New Inventors (ABC 2004–2011)
 Open Homes Australia (Nine Network 2020–)
 Our House (Nine Network 1993–2001)
 Our Place (Nine Network 2005)
 The Outdoor Room (Seven Network 2008)
 Personal Column (HSV-7 1958–1959)
 Personal Touch (Network Ten 1966)
 Poh & Co. (ABC 2013–2016)
 Poh's Kitchen (ABC 2010–2012)
 Postcards (Nine Network 1995–2008, WIN Television/Nine Network 2008–2011)
 Queensland Weekender (Seven Network Queensland 2003–2020)
 Ralph TV (Nine Network 2007)
 Ready Steady Cook (Network Ten 2005–2013)
 Renovation Rescue (Nine Network 2006)
 Room for Improvement (Seven Network 2000–2003)
 SA Life (Seven Network South Australia 2012–2017)
 SA Weekender (Seven Network South Australia 2017–2020)
 Second Opinion (ABC 2005)
 Sow What (ABC 1967–1988)
 Surfing the Menu (ABC 2003–2006)
 Surfing the Menu: The Next Generation (ABC 2016)
 Surprise Chef (Seven Network 2001–2003)
 Sydney Weekender (Seven Network Sydney 1994–2020)
 Teenage Boss (ABC 2019–2020)
 Televisit (TVW-7 1960–1965)
 Three Blue Ducks (Network Ten 2021)
 Things To Try Before You Die (Nine Network 2007)
 Travelcade (TEN Queensland, Prime and QSTV 1990–1996)
 TV Kitchen (Nine Network 1971–1976)
 WA Weekender (Seven Network Western Australia 2014–2017)
 What's On (HSV-7 1959)
 Woman's World (SES-8)
 Women's World (ABC 1957–1963)
 The World of Glamour (TCN-9 1964–1965)
 Your Home (ATN-7 1956–1964)
 Your Life on the Lawn (Seven Network 2003)
 You've Got the Job (Seven Network 2006)
 The Zone (Nine Network 1994–1995)

Music

 The Loop (10 Peach 2012–2020)
 Music Express (SES-8 Mt. Gambier)
 The Set (ABC 2018–2019)

News and current affairs

 #TalkAboutIt (Australia Plus TV 2011–2016)
 11AM (Seven Network 1982–1999)
 6.30 with George Negus (Network Ten 2011)
 7 Days (ABC 2001–2005)
 The 7.30 Report (ABC 1986–2011)
 ABC Fora (ABC 2008–2009)
 Alan Jones Live (Network Ten 1994)
 Asia Pacific Focus (ABC 2001–2014)
 Australia Wide (ABC 2005–2008)
 Breakfast (Network Ten 2012)
 Business Breakfast (ABC 2002–2003)
 Business Sunday (Nine Network 1986–2006)
 Business Today (Australia Plus TV 2006–2014)
 Capital Hill (ABC News 24 2010–2015)
 The Daily Edition (Seven Network 2013—2020)
 The Dalley Edition (Sky News 2014–2016)
 Difference of Opinion (ABC 2007)
 Entertainment Tonight Australia (Nine Network 1999)
 Eric Baume's Viewpoint (TCN-9 1959–1961)
 Extra (Nine Network Brisbane 1992–2009)
 Face to Face (Seven Network 1995–1997)
 FAQ (ABC 1999–2000)
 Feedback (ABC 2002–2004)
 Financial Review Sunday (Nine Network 2013–2015)
 focus (NQTV 1979–)
 George Negus Tonight (ABC)
 Good Morning Australia (Network Ten 1981–1992)
 Good Morning Delhi (Network Ten, One 2010)
 Hadley! (Sky News Australia 2010)
 Hemispheres (co-produced with the CBC in Canada)
 Hinch (Seven Network 1987–1991, Network Ten 1992–1994)
 Hinch Live (Sky News Live 2015–2016, 2019)
 Hotline (SBS 1990–2007)
 Hungry Beast (ABC 2009–2011)
 Inside Business (ABC 2002–2013)
 Karvelas (Sky News Live 2016–2017)
 Lateline (ABC 1990–2017)
 Lateline Business (ABC 2006–2010)
 The Latest with Laura Jayes (Sky News Live 2016–2017)
 Mandarin News Australia (SBS 2010–2012)
 Meet the Press (Seven Network 1958–1967, Network Ten 1992–2013)
 Missing Persons Unit (Nine Network 2006–2009)
 News Magazine (HSV-7 1958–1960)
 Newsline with Jim Middleton (Australia Plus TV 2008–2014)
 Newsweek (NQTV 1978–1989)
 Nightline (Nine Network 1988–2008)
 Nine News at 7 (9Gem 2013)
 The Observer Effect (SBS ONE 2013)
 Pyne & Marles (Sky News 2016–2018)
 Richo (Sky News 2011–2016)
 PVO NewsDay (Sky News Live 2015–2017)
 The Quarters (ABC News 24 2010–2015)
 Quantum (ABC 1985–2001)
 Real Life (Seven Network 1992–1994)
 Revealed (Network Ten 2013)
 Richo (Sky News Live 2014–2016)
 Seven News at 7 (7Two 2013–2014)
 Speers Tonight (Sky News Live 2016–2017)
 State to State (ABC 2010–2015)
 Stateline (ABC 1996–2010)
 Sunday (Nine Network 1981–2008)
 Sunday Night (Seven Network 2009–2019)
 Ten Eyewitness News Early (Network Ten 2013–2014)
 Ten Eyewitness News Late (Network Ten 2012–2014)
 Ten Eyewitness News Morning (Network Ten 2013–2014)
 Terry Willesee Tonight (Seven Network 1984–1988)
 This Afternoon (Nine Network 2009)
 This Day Tonight (ABC 1967–1978)
 This I Believe (ATN-7 1956–1958)
 The Times (Seven Network 1994–1995)
 Today (GTV-9 1960–1961, no relation to later program of the same name)
 Today Tonight (Seven Network 1995–2014, Seven Adelaide and Seven Perth 2014–2019)
 To the Point (Sky News Live 2015–2017)
 The Truth Is (Network Ten 2013)
 Viewpoint (Sky News 2003–2004, 2012–2016)
 Wake Up (Network Ten 2013–2014)
 Wanted (Network Ten 2013)
 Willesee (Seven Network 1975–1982, Nine Network 1984–1988) 
 Witness (Seven 1990s)

Reality

 The $20 Challenge (Network Ten 2000)
 10 Years Younger in 10 Days (Seven Network 2009)
 All Together Now (Seven Network 2018)
 The Apprentice Australia (Nine Network 2009)
 Aussie BBQ Heroes (Seven Network 2015)
 Aussie Pickers (A&E Australia 2013–2014)
 Aussie Queer Eye for the Straight Guy (Network Ten 2005)
 Australia's Cheapest Weddings (Seven Network 2016)
 Australia's Next Top Model (FOX8 2005–2017)
 Australia's Perfect Couple (Nine Network 2009)
 Australian Idol (Network Ten 2003–2009)
 Australian Spartan (Seven Network 2018, 7mate 2019)
 Bachelor in Paradise Australia (Network Ten 2018–2020)
 The Bachelorette Australia (Network Ten 2015–2021)

 Back with the Ex (Seven Network 2018)
 The Band (Network Ten)
 Battle of the Choirs (Seven Network 2008)
 Beauty and the Geek Australia (Seven Network 2009–2014)
 Being Lara Bingle (Network Ten 2012)
 The Big Adventure (Seven Network 2014)
 Big Brother (Network Ten 2001–2008, Nine Network 2012–2014)
 The Biggest Loser (Network Ten 2006–2017)
 Bride & Prejudice (Seven Network 2017–2019)
 The Briefcase (Nine Network 2016)
 Bringing Sexy Back (Seven Network 2014)
 Brynne: My Bedazzled Life (Seven Network 2012)
 The Celebrity Apprentice Australia (Nine Network 2011–2015)
 Celebrity Big Brother (Network Ten 2002)
 Celebrity Come Dine With Me Australia (Lifestyle Food 2012–2014)
 Celebrity Dog School (Network Ten 2007)
 Celebrity MasterChef Australia (Network Ten 2009)
 Celebrity Overhaul (Nine Network 2005–2006)
 Celebrity Splash! (Seven Network 2013)
 Celebrity Survivor (Seven Network 2006)
 The Chefs' Line (SBS 2017–2019)
 Child Genius (SBS 2018)
 The Chopping Block (Nine Network 2008–2009)
 The Colony (SBS 2005)
 Come Date with Me (Eleven 2013–2014)
 Come Dine with Me Australia (Lifestyle Food 2011–2015)
 Cricket Superstar (FOX8 2012)
 Dance Boss (Seven Network 2018)
 Dancing with the Stars (Seven Network 2004–2015, Network Ten 2019–2020)
 Date Night (Nine Network 2018)
 Dating in the Dark Australia (FOX8 2010–2012)
 Demolition Man (A&E Australia 2017)
 Dinner Date (Seven Network 2011)
 Don't Tell the Bride (Network Ten 2012)
 Dreamhome (Nine Network 2000)
 Eco House Challenge (SBS 2007)
 Everybody Dance Now (Network Ten 2012)
 Excess Baggage (Nine Network/Go! 2012)
 The Family (SBS 2011–2012)
 Family Food Fight (Nine Network 2017–2018)
 First Dates (Seven Network 2016–2020)
 Football Superstar (FOX8 2008–2011)
 Formal Wars (Seven Network 2013)
 Four Weddings (Seven Network 2010)
 Freshwater Blue (MTV Australia 2011)
 The Fugitive (Network Ten)
 Girlband (Network Ten 2006)
 Good Game (ABC2 2006–2006)
 Gus Worland: Marathon Man (A&E Australia 2014–)
 Hell's Kitchen Australia (Seven Network 2017)
 homeMADE (Nine Network 2009)
 The Hot House (Network Ten 2004)
 The Hot Plate (Nine Network 2015)
 House From Hell (Network Ten 1998)
 House Rules (Seven Network 2013–2020)
 I Do I Do (Network Ten)
 I Will Survive (Network Ten 2012)
 Instant Hotel (Seven Network 2017–2019)
 Iron Chef Australia (Seven Network 2010)
 It Takes Two (Seven Network 2006–2009)
 Junior MasterChef Australia (Network Ten 2010–2011)
 Kiss Bang Love (Seven Network 2016)
 Last Chance Learners (Seven Network 2007)
 The Last Resort (Nine Network 2017)
 Let's Do Coffee (Network Ten 2015–2016)
 The Lost Tribes (Nine Network 2007)
 Love Island Australia (9Go!/Nine Network 2018–2019)
 Make Me a Supermodel (Seven Network 2008)
 MasterChef Australia All-Stars (Network Ten 2012)
 MasterChef Australia: The Professionals (Network Ten 2013)
 Meet the Hockers (9Go! 2017)
 Making It Australia (Network Ten 2021)
 The Mentor (Seven Network 2018)
 The Mole (Seven Network 2000–2003, 2005, 2013)
 My Kid's a Star (Nine Network 2008)
 My Kitchen Rules (Seven Network 2010–2020)
 My Restaurant Rules (Seven Network 2004–2005)
 Neighbours at War (Nine Network 2007)
 Nerds FC (SBS 2006–2007)
 The NRL Rookie (9Go! 2016)
 Outback House (ABC 2005)australian tv
 Outback Jack (Nine Network 2004–2005)
 Pawn Stars Australia (A&E Australia 2015–)
 Photo Number 6 (Network Ten 2018)
 Planet Cake (Lifestyle Food 2011)
 Playing It Straight (Seven Network 2004)
 Please Marry My Boy (Seven Network 2012–2013)
 Pooch Perfect (Seven Network reality 2020)
 Popstars (Seven Network 2000–2002)
 Popstars Live (Seven Network 2004)
 Project Runway Australia (Arena 2008–2012)
 The Proposal (Seven Network 2019)
 The Real Dirty Dancing (Seven Network 2019)
 Reno Rumble (Nine Network 2015–2016)
 Queer Eye for the Straight Guy (Network Ten 2005)
 The Real Housewives of Melbourne (Arena 2014–2021)
 The Real Housewives of Sydney (Arena 2017)
 Recipe to Riches (Network Ten 2013–2014)
 The Recruit (Fox8 2014)
 The Renovators (Network Ten 2011)
 The Resort (Network Ten 2004)
 Restaurant Revolution (Seven Network 2015)
 Say Yes to the Dress: Australia (Arena 2016)
 Search for a Supermodel (Network Ten 2000–2002)
 Seven Year Switch (Seven Network 2016–2017)
 Shark Tank (Network Ten 2015–2018)
 The Shire (Network Ten 2012)
 Silvia's Italian Table (ABC 2016)
 The Single Wives (Seven Network 2018)
 So You Think You Can Dance Australia (Network Ten 2008–2010, 2014)
 The Stafford Brothers (FOX8 2011–2012)
 StarStruck (Nine Network 2000)
 StarStruck (Nine Network 2005)
 The Steph Show (Network Ten 2006)
 The Super Switch (Seven Network 2019)
 Sylvania Waters (ABC 1992)
 Teen Fit Camp (Network Ten 2007)
 Teen Mom Australia (MTV 2019, 10 Shake 2020)
 This Time Next Year (Nine Network 2017–2019)
 Top Design Australia (Nine Network 2011)
 Top Gear Australia (SBS 2008–2010, Nine Network 2010–2011)
 Torvill and Dean's Dancing on Ice (Nine Network 2006)
 Treasure Island (Seven Network 2000)
 Trial By Kyle (Network Ten 2019)
 Undercover Boss Australia (Network Ten 2010)
 The Voice Kids (Nine Network 2014)
 WAG Nation (Arena 2012)
 When Love Comes to Town (Nine Network 2014)
 The X Factor (Network Ten 2005, Seven Network 2010–2016)
 Yasmin's Getting Married (Network Ten 2006)
 Young Talent Time (Network Ten 1971–1988, 2012)
 Yummy Mummies (Seven Network 2017–2019)
 Zumbo's Just Desserts (Seven Network 2016–2019)

Soap operas

 Arcade (Network Ten 1980)
 Autumn Affair (ATN-7/GTV-9 1958–1959)
 Bellbird (ABC 1967–1977)
 The Box (Network Ten 1974–1977)
 Breakers (Network Ten 1997–1999)
 Carson's Law (Network Ten 1983–1984)
 Certain Women (ABC 1973–1976)
 Chances (Nine Network 1991–1992)
 Class of 74 (Seven Network 1974–1975)
 Cop Shop (Seven Network 1977–1984)
 Counter Play (9Go! 2018–2019)
 A Country Practice (Seven Network 1981–1993, Network Ten 1994)
 Crash Palace (Fox8 2001–2001)
 E Street (Network Ten 1989–1993)
 Echo Point (Network Ten 1995)
 Family and Friends (Nine Network 1990)
 Glenview High (Seven Network 1977–1978)
 Heartbreak High (Network Ten 1993–1996, ABC 1997–1999)
 The Heights (ABC 2019–2021)
 Holiday Island (Network Ten 1981)
 Hotel Story (Network Ten 1977)
 Kings (Nine Network 1984)
 Lane End (ABC 1972)
 Motel (Seven Network 1968)
 Number 96 (Network Ten 1972–1977)
 Out of the Blue (Network Ten 2008–2010)
 Pacific Drive (Nine Network 1995)
 Paradise Beach (Nine Network 1993–1994)
 Possession (Nine Network 1985)
 The Power, The Passion (Seven Network 1989)
 Prime Time (Nine Network 1986–1987)
 Prisoner (Network Ten 1979–1986)
 Punishment (Network Ten 1981)
 The Restless Years (Network Ten 1977–1981)
 Return to Eden (Network Ten 1986)
 Richmond Hill (Network Ten 1988)
 Shark Bay (Foxtel 1996)
 Skyways (Seven Network 1979–1981)
 Something in the Air (ABC 2000–2002)
 Sons and Daughters (Seven Network 1981–1987)
 Starting Out (Nine Network 1983)
 The Story of Peter Grey (Seven Network 1961–1962)
 The Sullivans (Nine Network 1976–1983)
 Taurus Rising (Nine Network 1983)
 The Unisexers (Nine Network 1975)
 Until Tomorrow (Seven Network 1975)
 Waterloo Station (Nine Network 1983)
 You Can't See 'Round Corners 1963
 The Young Doctors (Nine Network 1976–1983)

Special events
 50 Years 50 Shows (Nine Network 2005–2006)
 50 Years 50 Stars (Nine Network 2006)
 50 Years Young (Network Ten 2014)
 Australia Unites: Reach Out To Asia (Seven Network/Nine Network/Network Ten)
 Countdown to 3 (ABC 2009)
 Deadly Awards (SBS 1995–2013)
 Diva Awards (Fox8 2003)
 Lights, Camera, Party!: Television City Celebrates (Nine Network 2010)
 My Favourite Album (ABC 2006)
 My Favourite Australian (ABC 2008)
 My Favourite Book (ABC 2004)
 My Favourite Film (ABC 2005)
 Nickelodeon Australian Kids' Choice Awards (Nickelodeon 2003–2011)
 Oz Concert (SBS)
 Seriously 40 (Network Ten 2005)
 SlimeFest (Nickelodeon 2012–)
 TV Turns 50 (Seven Network 2006)

Sport

 Any Given Sunday (AFL) (Nine Network 2005–2006)
 Australian Premier League Football Show (Aurora Community Channel)
 Before the Game (AFL) (Network Ten 2003–2013) (as After the Game in 2003)
 Beyond the Boundary (AFL) (Network Ten)
 Boots N' All (NRL) (Fox Sports/Nine Network)
 The Bounce (AFL) (Seven Network 2010)
 Contact Sport (ABC News 24 2010–2012)
 The Dream in Athens with Roy & HG (Seven Network August 2004) (Athens Greece Summer Olympics) 
 The Dream with Roy & HG (Seven Network September–October 2000) (Sydney 2000 Summer Olympics)
 Double Dribble (ABC2 2014)
 Eric Welch's Sports Album (GTV-9 1957)
 The Fat (moved to the Seven Network from ABC and became 110% Tony Squires in 2004)
 The Fifth Quarter (AFL) (Network Ten 2004–2011)
 Football Inquest (1957 series on GTV-9 and a 1960–1974 series on HSV-7)
 Football Survey (GTV-9 1957)
 The Footy Show (HSV-7 1957–1958)
 The Footy Show (AFL) (Nine Network 1994–2019)
 The Footy Show (rugby league) (Nine Network 1994–2018)
 The Full Brazilian (SBS ONE 2014)
 The Game Plan (AFL) (One 2011–2012)
 The Game Plan (NRL) (One 2011–2013, Network Ten 2012)
 The Ice Dream With Roy & HG (Seven Network February 2002) (Salt Lake City USA Winter Olympics)
 In Conversation with Alex Malley (Nine Network 2016–2018)
 Inside Edge (ABC News 24 2012)
 John Coleman on Football (HSV-7 1957)
 Junior Sports Magazine (ABC 1962–1965)
 League Teams (HSV-7 1960s & 1970s)
 Live and Kicking (Seven Network 1998–1999)
 Live and Sweaty (ABC 1991–1995)
 The Marngrook Footy Show (NITV 2007–2019, ABC2 2011–2012)
 Olympics on Nine (Nine Network/9Gem 1956, 1976, 1992, 1994, 2010, 2012)
 Olympics on Seven (Seven Network 1992, 1996, 2000, 2004, 2008, 2016, 2020)
 Olympics on Ten (Network Ten/One 1984, 1988, 2014)
 One Week at a Time (AFL) (One 2009–2011)
 One Week at a Time (NRL) (One 2011)
 Ra (FOX8 2005)
 RPM (Network Ten 1997–2008, 2015–2020, One 2011)
 Sam and The Fatman (Nine Network 2000)
 Santo, Sam and Ed's Total Football (2013–2015) on Fox Sports(Australia)
 Saturday Sports Round-Up (GTV-9 1957)
 Sideliners (ABC 2017)
 Sports Parade (GTV-9 1957)
 Sports Talk (HSV-7 1956–1959)
 Sports Tonight (Network Ten 1993–2009, Network Ten/One 2009–2012, Network 10 2018–2019)
 SportsFan Clubhouse (7mate 2013–2015)
 Sportsline (Sky News 1996–2014)
 SportsNight with James Bracey (Sky News Live 2013–2016)
 Sportsworld (Seven Network 1990–2006)
 Surf and Snow (Network Ten, One 2014)
 Talking Footy (1995–2004)
 Teams on 10 (2020–2021)
 Thursday FC (SBS 2 2013–2014)
 Thursday Night Live (all) (One 2009–2010)
 The Thursday Night Sport Show (One 2014)
 Toyota World Sport (SBS 2005–2006)
 V8Xtra (Seven Network 2007–2014)
 The Western Front (Network Ten 2002–2011)
 World of Sport (Seven Network 1957–1987)

Talk and variety

 9am with David & Kim (Network Ten 2006–2009)
 Access 1974 (ABC 1974)
 Adam Hills Tonight (ABC 2011–2013)
 Agony Aunts (ABC 2012)
 The Agony of... (ABC 2012–2015)
 The Agony of Christmas (ABC 2013)
 The Agony of Life (ABC 2013)
 Agony Uncles (ABC 2012)
 Andrew Denton's Interview (Seven Network 2018–2019)
 The Annette Klooger Show (ABC 1959–1961)
 Anything Goes (GTV-9 1957)
 Astor Showcase (ATN-7 1957–1959)
 At Seven on 7 (ATN-7 1956–1957)
 Auditions (HSV-7 1962)
 Australia Versus (Seven Network 2010)
 Australia's Amateur Hour (TCN-9/HSV-7 1957–1958)
 Bandwagon (HSV-7 1959–1960)
 Be My Guest (HSV-7 1957)
 Beauty and the Beast (Seven Network 1964–1973; 1982, Network Ten 1982–1983; 1996–2002, Foxtel 1996–2002; 2005–2007)
 The Beer Factor (GO! 2012)
 Beginners, Please (ABC 1961)
 Bentley's Bandbox (ABC 1960)
 Between Ourselves (ABC 1963)
 The Big Breakfast (Network Ten 1992–1995)
 The Big Schmooze (Comedy Channel 2000–2001)
 The Bobby Limb Show (Nine Network, 1959–1961, then became The Mobil-Limb Show)
 Boomerang (GTV-9 1961–1962)
 The Bottom Line (Nine Network 2013–2014)
 BP Super Show (circa 1959 to circa 1970)
 Brenda's Time (HSV-7 1959)
 The Burning Question (ATN-7 1957–1960)
 Cafe Continental (ABC 1958–1961)
 Can of Worms (Network Ten 2011–2013)
 Canberra Report (ATN-7 1959–1960)
 Canberra Week (ABC 1963–1965)
 The Catch-Up (Nine Network 2007)
 Chris & Julia's Sunday Night Takeaway (Network Ten 2019)
 The Circle (Network Ten 2010–2012)
 Clarke and Dawe (ABC 2013–2017)
 Club Seven (HSV-7 1959–1961)
 Coast to Coast (Nine Network 1987–1989)
 Comment (ATN-7 1958–1960)
 Common Sense (Lifestyle/Network Ten 2017)
 The Contact Show (TCN-9 1960)
 Couch Time (Eleven 2011–2017)
 Curtain Call (ATN-7 1960)
 The Daily Edition (Seven Network 2013–2020)
 Daly at Night (HSV-7 1962–1963)
 The Danny Dean Show (ATN-7 1959–1960)
 David Tench Tonight (Network Ten 2006)
 The Delo and Daly Show (Seven Network 1963–1964)
 Denise (Seven Network 1998–2001)
 Dita (Network Ten 1967–1970)
 The Don Lane Show (Nine Network 1975–1983)
 Elders with Andrew Denton (ABC 2008–2009)
 Enough Rope with Andrew Denton (ABC 2003–2008)
 Eric and Mary (HSV-7 1956)
 The Eric Bana Show Live (1997)
 An Evening With (CTC-7 1966–1967)
 The Evie Hayes Show (ABV-2 1960)
 Fiesta (ABC 1958)
 First Appearances (ABC 1962)
 Floorshow (ABC 1963)
 Gaslight Music Hall (ABC/TCN-9 1959–1960)
 The George Wallace Show (TCN-9 1960)
 The Glass House (ABC 2001–2006)
 The Golden Show (Seven Network 1964)
 Good Morning Australia with Bert Newton (Network Ten 1993–2005) formerly known as The Morning Show (Network Ten 1992)
 Good Morning Delhi (Network Ten/One 2010)
 Greeks on the Roof (Seven Network 2003)
 Guest of the Week (HSV-7 1956–1957)
 Hal Lashwood's Alabama Jubilee (ABC 1958–1961)
 The Happy Go Lucky Show (GTV-9 1957–1959)
 Here Come the Girls (ABC 1960)
 Hey Hey It's Saturday (Nine Network 1971–1999, 2009–2010)
 His and Hers (Network Ten, 1971–1972)
 Hold Everything (HSV-7 1961)
 Homeward Bound (ABV-2 1958)
 House Party (HSV-7 1959–1960)
 In Brisbane Today (Nine Network Queensland 1990–1992, hosted by Fiona McDonald)
 In Melbourne Today (GTV-9 1957–1958)
 In Melbourne Tonight (Nine Network 1957–70 and became The Graham Kennedy Show from 1972–1975, Nine Network 1996–1998)
 The Isador Goodman Show – (HSV-7 1956–1957)
 The Jimmy Wheeler Show (ABC 1960)
 Joe Martin's Late Show (TCN 1959)
 The Johnny Gredula Show (ABC 1957–1958)
 The Johnny O'Connor Show (TCN-9 1956)
 Just Barbara (ABV-2 1961)
 Katrina (ATV-0/ATV-10, 1967)
 The Ken Noyle Show (ABC 1958)
 Kerri-Anne (Nine Network 2002–2011)
 The Late Show (HSV-7 1957–1959)
 Latin Holiday (ABC 1961)
 Leave it to the Girls (GTV-9 1957)
 Like You to Meet (HSV-7 1959)
 Live on Bowen (C31 Melbourne 2012–2015)
 Little Big Shots (2017–2019)
 Make Mine Music (Seven Network 1962)
 Malcolm Muggeridge Meets Australians (Nine Network 1958)
 Meet (ABC 1957)
 Meet James Mossman (ATN-7 1957–1958)
 Meet Me at Bebarfalds (TCN-9 1958–1959)
 Men at the Top (ABC 1959)
 Merry-Go-Round (HSV-7 1961)
 Micallef Tonight (with Shaun Micallef 2003)
 The Midday Show (Nine Network 1985–1998)
 The Mike Walsh Show (Network Ten 1973–1977, Nine Network 1977–1984 then became The Midday Show from 1985–1998)
 Mouthing Off (The Comedy Channel)
 Music and Dance (ABV-2 1959)
 New Faces (Nine Network 1963–1985, 1989–1990, Network Ten 1991–1993)
 The NightCap (Seven Network/7HD 2008)
 Noel and Mary (ATV-0 1967)
 Off the Peg (ABC 1965)
 Old-Time Ballroom (ABC 1959–1960)
 O'Loghlin on Saturday Night (ABC 1999)
 On Camera (ATN-7 1959–1960)
 On the Couch with Wippa (Eleven 2013)
 On the Spot (GTV-9 1959–1960)
 Open Hearing (ABC 1960–1961)
 Open House (GTV-9 1957–1958)
 Oxford Show (HSV-7 1957–1958)
 The Panel (Network Ten 1998–2004)
 Penthouse (ATN-7 1960–1961)
 Person to Person (ATN-7 1959–1960)
 Personal Album (GTV-9 1958–1959)
 Personal Column (HSV-7 1958–1959)
 Personally Yours (ABC 1962)
 Pictures of You (Seven Network 2012)
 Reality Check (ABC1 2014–2015)
 The Red Moore Show (ABC 1962)
 Rendezvous at Romano's (TCN-9 1957)
 Rooftop Rendezvous (ABC 1959)
 Room for Two (ATN-7 1958–1959)
 Roundabout (ATV-0 1967–1971)
 Rove (Nine Network 1999, Network Ten 2000–2009)
 Rove LA (FOX8 2011–2012)
 Salam Cafe (Channel 31 2005–2008, SBS 2008)
 Santo, Sam and Ed's Sports Fever! (Seven Network/7mate 2012)
 Saturday Night Rove (Network Ten 2019)
 Saturday Party (ABV-2 1959)
 The Saturday Show (ABV-2, 1959)
 Saturday Showcase (HSV-7 1960)
 Say It with Music (TCN-9 1957–1958)
 Say It with Music (Network Ten 1967–1969)
 Screen Time (ABC 2017)
 Seeing Stars (ABC, 1957–1959)
 The Shirley Abicair Show (ATN-7/GTV-9, 1958)
 Shower of Stars (ATN-7 1959)
 Showtime (ABC 1959–1960)
 The Sideshow (ABC 2007)
 The Simon Gallaher Show (ABC 1982–1983)
 The Spearman Experiment (Network Ten 2009)
 Stairway to the Stars (HSV-7 1956–1958)
 Startime (Seven Network 1962–1963)
 State Your Case (ATN-7 1957)
 The Steph Show (Network Ten 2006)
 Stop Laughing...This Is Serious (ABC 2015–2017)
 Studio A (Seven Network 1963–1964)
 Studio A (C312008–2011)
 Susie (WIN Television 2007–2009)
 Swallow's Juniors (HSV-7 1957–1970, later retitled Brian and the Juniors)
 Sydney Tonight (ATN-7 1956–1959)
 Take it Easy (GTV-9 1959–1960)
 Take Three (ABC 1961–1962)
 Talking Heads (ABC 2005–2010)
 Tele-Variety (ABC 1957–1958)
 Theatre Royal (BTQ-7 1961–1968)
 This Week Live (Network Ten 2013)
 Thursday at One (1957–1960 GTV-9)
 Tivoli Party Time (HSV-7 1957)
 Toddy Time (GTV 1961)
 Tonight in Canberra (CTC-7 1968)
 Tonight Live with Steve Vizard (Seven Network 1990–1993)
 The Toppanos (ATN-7 1958–1959)
 Town Talk (TCN-9 1957)
 TV Channell (ABC 1956–1957)
 TV Showboat (ABC 1960)
 TV Talent Scout (ATN-7 1957–1958)
 Two's Company (ABV-2 1959–1961)
 Under Melbourne Tonight (C31 1993–1997)
 Under Melbourne Tonight Presents...... What's Goin' On There? (C31 1998)
 Variety 7 (HSV-7 1963–1964)
 Variety View (ABV-2 1958–1959)
 Vikki (ABC 1963)
 Western Holiday (HSV-7 1960)
 Where Are They Now? (Seven Network 2006–2007)
 Whovians (ABC2 2017–2019)
 Women at the Top (ABC 1959)
 Wonderful World (HSV-7 1959–1960)

See also
 List of Australian television news services
 List of live television plays broadcast on ABC (1950–1969)
 List of longest-running Australian television series
 List of longest-running UK television series
 List of New Zealand television series
 Lists of Canadian television series

References

External links
 Australian Television Information Archive

Australian television series
Australia